= Israel at the FIFA World Cup =

International football delegation

This is a record of the Israel national team's results at the FIFA World Cup. They have qualified for the tournament on one occasion, in 1970. Israel qualified for the 1970 World Cup as an Asian team. Nowadays, Israel competes in the European zone, as well as being a full member of UEFA since the 1990s.

== History ==
Both in 1934 and in 1938, Mandatory Palestine competed in the FIFA World Cup qualifiers. In 1970, the Israel national football team competed in the FIFA World Cup final-tournament for the very first time. FIFA states in reference to this 1930s Palestine Mandate team that Asia's (AFC's) 'Palestine team', which had participated in previous competitions during the 1930s, was actually the forerunner of current Europe's (UEFA's) Israel national team; and, as such, bears no-relation to the national team of the Palestinian Authority whatsoever.

== Record at the FIFA World Cup ==
Israel's FIFA World Cup record										Qualification record							
Year	Round	Pos	Pld	W	D*	L	GF	GA	Squad	Outcome	Pld	W	D	L	GF	GA	Confederation
As Mandatory Palestine (Eretz Israel)										As Mandatory Palestine (Eretz Israel)							
(Uruguay) 1930	Did not enter									Did not enter							
(Italy) 1934	Did not qualify									2nd	2	0	0	2	2	11	Africa/Asia
(France) 1938	Did not qualify									2nd	2	0	0	2	1	4	Europe
As Israel										As Israel							
(Brazil) 1950	Did not qualify									2nd	2	0	0	2	2	11	Europe
(Switzerland) 1954	Did not qualify									3rd	4	0	0	4	0	5	Europe
(Sweden) 1958	Did not qualify									Play-off	2	0	0	2	0	4	CAF/AFC
(Chile) 1962	Did not qualify									Final Round	6	3	1	2	13	14	UEFA
(England) 1966	Did not qualify									3rd	4	0	0	4	1	12	UEFA
(Mexico) 1970	Group stage	12th	3	0	2	1	1	3	Squad	Final Round	4	3	1	0	8	1	AFC/OFC
(West Germany) 1974	Did not qualify									Zone A Final	6	4	1	1	12	2	AFC/OFC
(Argentina) 1978	Did not qualify									First round	4	2	1	1	5	3	AFC/OFC
(Spain) 1982	Did not qualify									5th	8	1	3	4	6	10	UEFA
(Mexico) 1986	Did not qualify									2nd	6	3	1	2	17	6	OFC
(Italy) 1990	Did not qualify									Play-off	6	1	4	1	5	5	OFC
(United States) 1994	Did not qualify									6th	10	1	3	6	10	27	UEFA
(France) 1998	Did not qualify									3rd	8	4	1	3	9	7	UEFA
(South Korea) (Japan) 2002	Did not qualify									3rd	8	3	3	2	11	7	UEFA
(Germany) 2006	Did not qualify									3rd	10	4	6	0	15	10	UEFA
(South Africa) 2010	Did not qualify									4th	10	4	4	2	20	10	UEFA
(Brazil) 2014	Did not qualify									3rd	10	3	5	2	19	14	UEFA
(Russia) 2018	Did not qualify									4th	10	4	0	6	10	15	UEFA
(Qatar) 2022	Did not qualify									3rd	10	5	1	4	23	21	UEFA
(Canada) (Mexico) (United States) 2026	Did not qualify									3rd	8	4	0	4	19	20	UEFA
(Morocco) (Portugal) (Spain) (Argentina) (Paraguay) (Uruguay) 2030	To be determined									To be determined							UEFA
Total	Group stage	1/23	3	0	2	1	1	3	—	—	140	49	35	56	208	219	—

*Draws include knockout matches decided via penalty shoot-out

=== By Match ===
World Cup	Round	Opponent	Score	Result	Venue	Scorers
1970	Group stage	Uruguay	0–2	L	Puebla	—
1970	Group stage	Sweden	1–1	D	Toluca	M. Spiegler
1970	Group stage	Italy	0–0	D	Toluca	—

=== Record by Opponent ===
FIFA World Cup matches (by team)
Opponent	Wins	Draws	Losses	Total	Goals Scored	Goals Conceded
Italy	0	1	0	1	0	0
Sweden	0	1	0	1	1	1
Uruguay	0	0	1	1	0	2

== 1970 FIFA World Cup ==
At the 1970 FIFA World Cup, Israel participated for the first time. Israel qualified for the FIFA World Cup for the first time in 1970, along with El Salvador and Morocco.

Although it was reported in the build-up to the final draw that seedings would be used, as had been the case at the previous two World Cup Finals, the FIFA Organising Committee ultimately announced that there would be no seeding of teams. Instead, the sixteen teams were divided into four 'geographical groupings', which also took into account the teams' strengths and even political considerations; the system ensured that Israel and Morocco would not be drawn to face each other after Morocco had earlier threatened to withdraw from the tournament, as they had done from the Olympic football tournament two years earlier, if that were the case.

=== 1970 Qualifying Round ===
==== 1970 Qualifying Round 1 ====
During the 1970 FIFA World Cup qualification Israel received a First round bye in the first round and moved directly to the Second round.

==== 1970 Qualifying Round 2 ====
In the second round, North Korea, quarter-finalists at the previous tournament, were disqualified after refusing to play in Israel for political reasons.

Pos	Team	Pld	W	D	L	GF	GA	GD	Pts	Qualification
1	Israel	2	2	0	0	6	0	+6	4	Final round
2	New Zealand	2	0	0	2	0	6	−6	0	
3	North Korea	0	0	0	0	0	0	0	0	Withdrew

Updated to match(es) played on unknown. Source:

Pos	Team	Pld	W	D	L	GF	GA	GD	Pts	Qualification
1	Israel	2	1	1	0	2	1	+1	3	1970 FIFA World Cup
2	Australia	2	0	1	1	1	2	−1	1	

Source: RSSSF

28 September 1969	Israel	4 – 0	New Zealand	Ramat Gan Stadium, Ramat Gan, Israel
	Spiegler 48'; Spiegel 65'; Feigenbaum 72', 86'			Referee: Nassiri (Iran)

1 October 1969	Israel	2 – 0	New Zealand	Ramat Gan Stadium, Ramat Gan, Israel
	Spiegler 24'; Spiegel 33'			Referee: Nassiri (Iran)

==== 1970 Qualifying Final Round ====
Team 1	Agg.	Team 2	1st leg	2nd leg
Israel	2–1	Australia	1–0	1–1

4 December 1969	Israel	1 – 0	Australia	Ramat Gan Stadium, Ramat Gan
	Zeman 16' (o.g.)	Report		Referee: Ferdinand Marschall (Austria)

14 December 1969	Australia	1 – 1	Israel	Sydney Sports Ground, Sydney
	Watkiss 88'		79' Spiegler	Referee: Ferdinand Marschall (Austria)

=== 1970 FIFA World Cup Group 2 ===
Pos	Team	Pld	W	D	L	GF	GA	GD	Pts	Qualification
1	Italy	3	1	2	0	1	0	+1	4	Advance to knockout stage
2	Uruguay	3	1	1	1	2	1	+1	3	Advance to knockout stage
3	Sweden	3	1	1	1	2	2	0	3	
4	Israel	3	0	2	1	1	3	−2	2	

Source: FIFA
Uruguay vs Israel
2 June 1970
16:00

Uruguay	2–0	Israel
Maneiro 23'; Mujica 50'	Report

Estadio Cuauhtémoc, Puebla
Attendance: 20,654
Referee: Bobby Davidson (Scotland)

Uruguay	Israel

GK	1	Ladislao Mazurkiewicz
DF	4	Luis Ubiña
DF	2	Atilio Ancheta
DF	3	Roberto Matosas
DF	6	Juan Mujica
MF	7	Luis Cubilla
MF	5	Julio Montero Castillo
MF	8	Pedro Rocha (c)	(substituted off) 12'
FW	9	Víctor Espárrago
FW	10	Ildo Maneiro
FW	21	Julio Losada
Substitutions:
FW	20	Julio César Cortés	(substituted on) 12'
Manager:
Juan Hohberg

GK	1	Itzhak Vissoker
DF	12	Yisha'ayahu Schwager
DF	4	David Primo
DF	14	Danny Shmulevich-Rom	(substituted off) 57'
DF	5	Zvi Rosen
MF	6	Shmuel Rosenthal
MF	8	Giora Spiegel
MF	10	Mordechai Spiegler (c)
MF	7	Itzhak Shum
FW	9	Yehoshua Feigenbaum
FW	15	Rachamim Talbi	(substituted off) 46'
Substitutions:
DF	2	Shraga Bar	(substituted on) 46'
DF	16	Yochanan Vollach	(substituted on) 57'
Manager:
Emmanuel Scheffer

Assistant referees:
Rudolf Scheurer (Switzerland)
Seyoum Tarekegn (Ethiopia)

Sweden vs Israel
7 June 1970
12:00

Sweden	1–1	Israel
Turesson 53'	Report	Spiegler 56'

Estadio Luis Dosal, Toluca
Attendance: 9,624
Referee: Seyoum Tarekegn (Ethiopia)

Sweden	Israel

GK	12	Sven-Gunnar Larsson
DF	2	Hans Selander
DF	3	Kurt Axelsson
DF	20	Jan Olsson
DF	5	Roland Grip
MF	6	Tommy Svensson (c)
MF	7	Bo Larsson
MF	16	Tomas Nordahl
FW	18	Tom Turesson
FW	9	Ove Kindvall
FW	11	Örjan Persson	Booked	(substituted off) 75'
Substitutions:
FW	22	Sten Pålsson		(substituted on) 75'
Manager:
Orvar Bergmark

GK	1	Itzhak Vissoker
DF	2	Shraga Bar	Booked
DF	4	David Primo	Booked
DF	16	Yochanan Vollach		(substituted off) 51'
DF	5	Zvi Rosen
MF	12	Yisha'ayahu Schwager
MF	6	Shmuel Rosenthal
MF	7	Itzhak Shum
FW	10	Mordechai Spiegler (c)
FW	8	Giora Spiegel
FW	9	Yehoshua Feigenbaum
Substitutions:
MF	19	Roni Shuruk		(substituted on) 51'
Manager:
Emmanuel Scheffer

Assistant referees:
Andrei Rădulescu (Romania)
Josip-Drago Horvat (Yugoslavia)

Italy vs Israel
11 June 1970
16:00

Italy	0–0	Israel
	Report

Estadio Luis Dosal, Toluca
Attendance: 9,890
Referee: Ayrton Vieira de Moraes (Brazil)

Italy	Israel

GK	1	Enrico Albertosi
DF	2	Tarcisio Burgnich
DF	5	Pierluigi Cera
DF	8	Roberto Rosato
DF	3	Giacinto Facchetti (c)
MF	10	Mario Bertini
MF	16	Giancarlo De Sisti
MF	15	Alessandro Mazzola
FW	13	Angelo Domenghini		(substituted off) 46'
FW	20	Roberto Boninsegna	Booked
FW	11	Luigi Riva
Substitutions:
MF	14	Gianni Rivera		(substituted on) 46'
Manager:
Ferruccio Valcareggi

GK	1	Itzhak Vissoker
DF	2	Shraga Bar
DF	4	David Primo	Booked
DF	12	Yisha'ayahu Schwager
DF	6	Shmuel Rosenthal
MF	5	Zvi Rosen
MF	3	Menachem Bello	Booked
MF	7	Itzhak Shum
FW	10	Mordechai Spiegler (c)
FW	8	Giora Spiegel
FW	9	Yehoshua Feigenbaum		(substituted off) 46'
Substitutions:
FW	14	Dani Shmulevich-Rom		(substituted on) 46'
Manager:
Emmanuel Scheffer

Assistant referees:
Seyoum Tarekegn (Ethiopia)
Kurt Tschenscher (West Germany)

Squad

Head coach: Emmanuel Scheffer

No.	Pos.	Player	Date of birth (age)	Caps	Club
1	GK	Yitzchak Vissoker	18 September 1944 (aged 25)	17	(Israel) Hapoel Petah Tikva
2	DF	Shraga Bar	24 March 1948 (aged 22)	13	(Israel) Maccabi Netanya
3	DF	Menachem Bello	26 December 1947 (aged 22)	25	(Israel) Maccabi Tel Aviv
4	MF	David Primo	5 May 1946 (aged 24)	18	(Israel) Hapoel Tel Aviv
5	DF	Zvi Rosen	23 June 1947 (aged 22)	16	(Israel) Maccabi Tel Aviv
6	DF	Shmuel Rosenthal	22 April 1947 (aged 23)	23	(Israel) Hapoel Petah Tikva
7	MF	Itzhak Shum	1 September 1948 (aged 21)	8	(Israel) Hapoel Kfar Saba
8	FW	Giora Spiegel	27 July 1947 (aged 22)	19	(Israel) Maccabi Tel Aviv
9	FW	Yehoshua Feigenbaum	5 December 1947 (aged 22)	15	(Israel) Hapoel Tel Aviv
10	FW	Mordechai Spiegler	19 August 1944 (aged 25)	36	(Israel) Maccabi Netanya
11	MF	George Borba	12 July 1944 (aged 25)	10	(Israel) Hapoel Tel Aviv
12	MF	Yisha'ayahu Schwager	10 February 1946 (aged 24)	6	(Israel) Maccabi Haifa
13	FW	Yechezekel Chazom	1 January 1947 (aged 23)	4	(Israel) Hapoel Tel Aviv
14	MF	Danny Shmulevich-Rom	29 November 1940 (aged 29)	24	(Israel) Maccabi Haifa
15	FW	Rachamim Talbi	17 May 1943 (aged 27)	25	(Israel) Maccabi Tel Aviv
16	DF	Yochanan Vollach	14 May 1945 (aged 25)	4	(Israel) Hapoel Haifa
17	FW	Eli Ben Rimoz	1 January 1947 (aged 23)	2	(Israel) Hapoel Jerusalem
18	MF	Moshe Romano	6 May 1946 (aged 24)	6	(Israel) Shimshon Tel Aviv
19	MF	Roni Shuruk	24 February 1946 (aged 24)	8	(Israel) Hakoah Maccabi Ramat Gan
20	DF	David Karako	11 February 1945 (aged 25)	6	(Israel) Maccabi Tel Aviv
21	GK	Yechiel Hameiri	20 August 1946 (aged 23)	1	(Israel) Hapoel Haifa
22	GK	Yair Nossovsky	29 June 1937 (aged 32)	3	(Israel) Hapoel Kfar Saba

== Qualifier history ==
Through the 2026 qualifier, Israel has entered the qualifiers for the World Cup on 23 occasions. In 1934 and 1938, Palestine, under the British Mandate, competed. As Israel was established in place of Palestine in 1948, Israel began competing in 1950. In all years but 1970 Israel failed to qualify for the World Cup.

1934 FIFA World Cup qualifier

At the 1934 FIFA World Cup, Mandatory Palestine competed in the Africa and Asia Group 12 qualifying round. Mandatory Palestine finished in second place and was eliminated.

The Palestine football team consisted of nine British footballers, six Jewish footballers and one Arab footballer. FIFA states in reference to the 1930s Palestine Mandate team that the 'Palestine team' that had participated in previous competitions in the 1930s, was actually the forerunner of today's Israel team and as such bears no relation to the national team of the Palestinian authority. However, the region currently known as Palestine is considered "one of the first Asian teams to compete in the FIFA World Cup qualifiers".

Standings

Pos	Team	Pld	W	D	L	GF	GA	GR	Pts
1	Egypt	2	2	0	0	11	2	5.500	4
2	Palestine, British Mandate	2	0	0	2	2	11	0.182	0
—	Turkey (W)	0	0	0	0	0	0	—	0

(W) Withdrew

Matches

16 March 1934	Egypt	7 – 1	Palestine, British Mandate	Cairo, Egypt
	El-Tetsh 11', 35', 51'; Taha 21', 79'; Latif 43', 87'		Nudelman 61'	Stadium: British Army Ground; Attendance: 13,000; Referee: Stanley Wells (England)

6 April 1934	Palestine, British Mandate	1 – 4	Egypt	Tel Aviv, Palestine/Eretz Israel
	Sukenik 54'		Latif 2'; El-Tetsh 7', 22'; Fawzi 35'	Stadium: Palms Stadium; Attendance: 8,000; Referee: Frederick Goodsby (England)

Squad

Coaches: (Mandatory Palestine) (Austria) Egon Pollak, (Mandatory Palestine) (Poland) Shimon Ratner

16/03/1934:
GK: Willy Berger (Hapoel Tel Aviv)
DF: Avraham Reznik (Maccabi Tel Aviv), Pinhas Fiedler (Maccabi Hasmonean)
MF: Zalman Friedman (Hapoel Tel Aviv), Gedalyahu Fuchs (Hapoel Haifa), Yohanan Sukenik (Hapoel Tel Aviv)
FW: Amnon Harlap (Hapoel Tel Aviv), Ferenc Kraus (Hapoel Tel Aviv), Paul Kastenbaum (Hapoel Tel Aviv), Haim Reich, Avraham Nudelman (Hapoel Tel Aviv)

06/04/1934:
GK: Willy Berger (Hapoel Tel Aviv)
DF: David Weinberg (Maccabi Tel Aviv), Pinhas Fiedler (Maccabi Hasmonean)
MF: Zalman Friedman (Hapoel Tel Aviv), Gedalyahu Fuchs (Hapoel Haifa), Yohanan Sukenik (Hapoel Tel Aviv)
FW: Amnon Harlap (Hapoel Tel Aviv), Ya'akov Levi-Meir (Hapoel Tel Aviv), Ya'akov Zelivanski (Maccabi Tel Aviv), Haim Reich, Avraham Nudelman (Hapoel Tel Aviv)

1938 FIFA World Cup qualifier

At the 1938 FIFA World Cup, Mandatory Palestine competed in the UEFA Group 6 qualifying round. Hungary, as the strongest team of this group, was seeded. Greece and Mandatory Palestine would play against each other on a home-and-away basis, with Hungary playing against the winner at home. Mandatory Palestine lost to Greece in the First Round, and finished in third and last place.

In 1938, World Cup marked the second (1934 being the first) and final time Mandatory Palestine competed in the World Cup. FIFA states in reference to the 1930s Palestine Mandate team that the 'Palestine team' that had participated in previous competitions in the 1930s was actually the forerunner of today's Israel team, and as such bears no relation to the national team of the Palestinian authority.

Standings

Pos	Team	Pld	W	D	L	GF	GA	GR	Pts
1	Greece	2	2	0	0	4	1	4.000	4
2	Palestine, British Mandate	2	0	0	2	1	4	0.250	0

Matches

22 January 1938	Palestine, British Mandate	1 – 3	Greece	Tel Aviv, Palestine/Eretz Israel
	Neufeld 36'	Report	Vikelidis 15', 30'; Migiakis 73'	Stadium: Maccabiah Stadium; Attendance: 8,000; Referee: Mohammed Youssef (Egypt)

20 February 1938	Greece	1 – 0	Palestine, British Mandate	Athens, Greece
	Vikelidis 88' (pen.)	Report		Stadium: Stadio Leoforos Alexandras; Attendance: 12,000; Referee: Mika Popovic (Yugoslavia)

Game 1
Mandatory Palestine vs Greece

(Mandatory Palestine) Palestine (British Mandate)	1 — 3 (final score after 90 minutes)	Greece
Manager: (Austria) Egon Pollak Team: 01 - GK - Julius Klein; 02 - DF - Avraham Beit haLevi; 03 - DF - Avraham Reznik (capt.); 04 - MF - Yosef Libermann; 05 - MF - Yohanan Sukenik; 06 - MF - Menahem Mirmovich; 07 - FW - Mila Ginzburg; 08 - FW - Shuka Brashedski; 09 - FW - Peri Neufeld; 10 - FW - Gaul Machlis; 11 - FW - Avraham Nudelmann Substitutes: none Unused Substitutes: ? Scorers: 1-2 Peri Neufeld (36')	Half-time: 1-2 Competition: World Cup qualifier 1938 (Group 5) Date: Saturday; 22 January 1938 Kick off: 3.30 p.m. Venue: Maccabiah Stadium, Tel Aviv Attendance: 5000 Referee: Mohamed Youssef EGY Assistants: ? Match rules: 90 minutes substitutes ?	Manager: (Greece) Kostas Negrepontis Team: 01 - GK - Spyros Sklavounos; 02 - DF - Georgios Gasparis; 03 - DF - Georgios Papadopoulos; 04 - MF - Anastassios Kritikos; 05 - MF - Antonis Kasimatis sub 46'; 06 - MF - Konstantinos Gikas; 07 - FW - Antonis Migiakis (capt.); 08 - FW - Dimitris Baltatsis; 09 - FW - Kleanthis Vikelidis; 10 - FW - Kleanthis Maropoulos; 11 - FW - Theologis Symeonidis Substitutes: 12 - MF - Spyros Kontoulis on 46' Unused Substitutes: ? Scorers: 0-1 Kleanthis Vikelidis (15'); 0-2 Kleanthis Vikelidis (30'); 1-3 Antonis Migiakis (73')

Game 2
Greece vs Mandatory Palestine

Greece	1 — 0 (final score after 90 minutes)	(Mandatory Palestine) Palestine (British Mandate)
Manager: (Greece) Kostas Negrepontis Team: 01 - GK - Spyros Sklavounos sub 15'; 02 - DF - Georgios Gasparis; 03 - DF - Georgios Papadopoulos; 04 - MF - Anastassios Kritikos; 05 - MF - Spyros Kontoulis; 06 - MF - Konstantinos Gikas; 07 - FW - Antonis Migiakis (capt.); 08 - FW - Spyros Depountis; 09 - FW - Kleanthis Vikelidis; 10 - FW - Kleanthis Maropoulos; 11 - FW - Vassilis Manetas Substitutes: 12 - GK - Nikolaos Sotiriadis on 15' Unused Substitutes: ? Scorers: 1-0 Kleanthis Vikelidis (86', pen.)	Half-time: 0-0 Competition: World Cup qualifier 1938 (Group 5) Date: Sunday; 20 February 1938 Kick off: 3 p.m. Venue: Leoforos Alexandras Stadium, Athens Attendance: 12000 Referee: Mika Popović YUG Assistants: ? Match rules: 90 minutes substitutes ?	Manager: (Austria) Egon Pollak Team: 01 - GK - Israel Elsner; 02 - DF - Avraham Beit haLevi; 03 - DF - Avraham Reznik (capt.); 06 - MF - Yosef Libermann; 05 - MF - Gdalyahu Fuchs; 04 - MF - Menahem Mirmovich; 08 - FW - Yona Stern; 10 - FW - Jerry Beit haLevi; 09 - FW - Peri Neufeld; 07 - FW - Gaul Machlis; 11 - FW - Natan Panz Substitutes: none Unused Substitutes: ? Scorers: -

Squad

Head coach: (Austria) Egon Pollak

Pos.	Player	DoB	Games played	Goals	Minutes played	Sub off	Sub on	(Greece)	(Greece)	Club
DF	Avraham Beit haLevi	1915	2	0	180	0	0	90	90	(Mandatory Palestine) Hapoel Tel Aviv
FW	Jerry Beit haLevi	14 November 1912	1	0	90	0	0	-	90	(Mandatory Palestine) Maccabi Tel Aviv
FW	Shuka Brashedski	1914	1	0	90	0	0	90	-	(Mandatory Palestine) Hapoel Haifa
GK	Israel Elsner	1909	1	0	90	0	0	-	90	(Mandatory Palestine) Maccabi Tel Aviv
MF	Gdalyahu Fuchs	1911	1	0	90	0	0	-	90	(Mandatory Palestine) Hapoel Haifa
FW	Mila Ginzburg	1918	1	0	90	0	0	90	-	(Mandatory Palestine) Maccabi Tel Aviv
GK	Julius Klein	1907	1	0	90	0	0	90	-	(Mandatory Palestine) Hapoel Haifa
MF	Yosef Libermann	1909	2	0	180	0	0	90	90	(Mandatory Palestine) Maccabi Tel Aviv
FW	Gaul Machlis	1918	2	0	180	0	0	90	90	(Mandatory Palestine) Maccabi Tel Aviv
MF	Menahem Mirmovich	1919	2	0	180	0	0	90	90	(Mandatory Palestine) Maccabi Tel Aviv
FW	Peri Neufeld	1913	2	1	180	0	0	90	90	(Mandatory Palestine) Maccabi Tel Aviv
FW	Avraham Nudelmann	1910	1	0	90	0	0	90	-	(Mandatory Palestine) Hapoel Tel Aviv
FW	Natan Pentz	1917	1	0	90	0	0	-	90	(Mandatory Palestine) Maccabi Tel Aviv
DF	Avraham Reznik	1909	2	0	180	0	0	90	90	(Mandatory Palestine) Maccabi Tel Aviv
FW	Yona Stern	1908	1	0	90	0	0	-	90	(Mandatory Palestine) Hapoel Haifa
MF	Yohanan Sukenik	1910	1	0	90	0	0	90	-	(Mandatory Palestine) Hapoel Tel Aviv

1950 FIFA World Cup qualifier

At the 1950 FIFA World Cup, Israel competed in the UEFA Group 3 qualifying round. Israel finished in third and last place.

This World Cup was the first for Israel, although they previously competed in 1934 and 1938 as Mandatory Palestine. FIFA states in reference to the 1930s Palestine Mandate team that the 'Palestine team' that had participated in previous competitions in the 1930s was actually the forerunner of today's Israel team and as such bears no relation to the national team of the Palestinian authority.

Standings

Pos	Team	Pld	W	D	L	GF	GA	GD	Pts
1	Yugoslavia	2	2	0	0	11	2	+9	4
2	Israel	2	0	0	2	2	11	−9	0

Matches

Israel competed in Group 3, which had 3 teams each. The strongest team, France, was seeded. The winner of the First Round would move on to the Final Round. Israel lost to Yugoslavia in the First Round and was eliminated.

21 August 1949	Yugoslavia	6–0	Israel	Belgrade, Yugoslavia
	Pajević 12', 19', 26'; Senčar 44'; Ž. Čajkovski 63'; Bobek 83' (pen.)	Report		Stadium: JNA Stadion; Attendance: 35,000; Referee: Giovanni Galeati (Italy)

18 September 1949	Israel	2–5	Yugoslavia	Tel Aviv, Israel
	Glazer 65', 76'	Report	Valok 19', 64'; Bobek 20'; Z. Čajkovski 41'; Ž. Čajkovski 82'	Stadium: Maccabiah Stadium; Attendance: 20,000; Referee: Yosef Kinstlich (Cyprus)

1954 FIFA World Cup qualifier

At the 1954 FIFA World Cup, Israel competed in the UEFA Group 10 qualifying round. Israel finished in third and last place.

Standings

Final table													Home							Away						
Rank	Team	Pld	W	D	L	GF	GA	GD	Pts	(Socialist Federal Republic of Yugoslavia)	(Greece)	(Israel)	Pld	W	D	L	GF	GA	Pts	Pld	W	D	L	GF	GA	Pts
1.	Yugoslavia	4	4	0	0	4	0	+4	8	X	1:0	1:0	2	2	0	0	2	0	4	2	2	0	0	2	0	4
2.	Greece	4	2	0	2	3	2	+1	4	0:1	X	1:0	2	1	0	1	1	1	2	2	1	0	1	2	1	2
3.	Israel	4	0	0	4	0	5	-5	0	0:1	0:2	X	2	0	0	2	0	3	0	2	0	0	2	0	2	0

Matches

1 November 1953	Greece	1 – 0	Israel	Athens, Greece
	Bembis	Report		Referee: Massai (Italy)

8 November 1953	Yugoslavia	1 – 0	Israel	Skopje, Yugoslavia
	Milutinović	Report		Referee: Alsteen (Belgium)

8 March 1954	Israel	0 – 2	Greece	Ramat Gan, Israel
		Report	Kokkinakis; Kamaras	Stadium: Ramat Gan Stadium; Referee: Buchmüller (Switzerland)

21 March 1954	Israel	0 – 1	Yugoslavia	Ramat Gan, Israel
		Report	Zebec	Stadium: Ramat Gan Stadium; Referee: Leafe (England)

1958 FIFA World Cup qualifier

At the 1958 FIFA World Cup, Israel competed in the Africa and Asia qualification round. The round was conducted in a knockout stage format. Israel won its group by default because its three opponents, Turkey, Indonesia and Sudan, refused to play.

The national team was placed in the African/Asian zone and was drawn to play against Turkey in the first round. However, Turkey withdrew in protest of being placed in the African/Asian zone (instead of the European Zone), and Israel advanced to the second round without playing a match, along with Indonesia, Egypt and Sudan. Israel was drawn to play Indonesia, but, as Indonesia refused to play in Israel and as FIFA rejected their request to play against Israel on neutral ground, Indonesia withdrew and Israel advanced to the regional finals, again without playing a match, alongside Sudan. In the final round, Sudan refused to play Israel for political reasons and withdrew. FIFA had imposed a rule that no team would qualify without playing at least one match, after it had happened in several previous World Cups. Wales, which finished second in its group behind Czechoslovakia, was drawn into a play-off, which they won.

CAF / AFC Preliminary Round - Group 2

Turkey refused to compete in the Asian group, so Israel advanced to the Second Round automatically.

Rank	Team	Pts	Pld	W	D	L	GF	GA
1	Israel	advanced						
—	Turkey	withdrew						

CAF / AFC second round

Indonesia withdrew after FIFA rejected their request to play against Israel on neutral ground. Israel advanced to the Final Round automatically.

Rank	Team	Pts	Pld	W	D	L	GF	GA
1=	Israel	advanced						
1=	Sudan	advanced						
—	Egypt	withdrew						
—	Indonesia	withdrew						

CAF / AFC Final Round

Sudan refused to play against Israel for political reasons, so Israel would technically qualify automatically, but before the qualification rounds began, FIFA ruled that no team would qualify without playing at least one match (except for the defending champions and the hosts), and Israel had yet to play any.

Rank	Team	Pts	Pld	W	D	L	GF	GA
1	Israel	advanced						
—	Sudan	withdrew						

UEFA / AFC Play-off

A special play-off was created between Israel and the runner-up of one of the UEFA Groups, where the teams played against each other on a home-and-away basis, with the winner qualifying. After Belgium refused, Wales, the runner-up of UEFA Group 4, was the team drawn from the UEFA group runners-up.

Standings

Pos	Team	Pld	W	D	L	GF	GA	GD	Pts
1	Wales	2	2	0	0	4	0	+4	4
2	Israel	2	0	0	2	0	4	−4	0

Matches

15 January 1958	Israel	0 – 2	Wales	Ramat Gan, Israel
		Report	L. Allchurch 38'; Bowen 65'	Stadium: Ramat Gan Stadium; Referee: Maurice Guigue (France)

5 February 1958	Wales	2 – 0	Israel	Cardiff, Wales
	I. Allchurch 76'; Jones 80'	Report		Stadium: Ninian Park; Referee: Klas Schipper (Netherlands)

1962 FIFA World Cup qualifier

At the 1962 FIFA World Cup, Israel competed in the UEFA Group 7 qualifying round. The round was conducted in a knockout stage format. The five teams in this group played in a knockout stage on a home-and-away basis, with Israel finishing in second place, after losing to Italy in the finals.

Bracket

First Round
Italy	-
bye	-
Romania	-
bye	-
Ethiopia	-
bye	-
Israel	1 6
Cyprus	1 1

Second Round
Italy	-
Romania	withdrew
Ethiopia	0 2
Israel	1 3

Final
Italy	4 6
Israel	2 0

Matches

First Round

Israel defeated Cyprus to advance to the Second Round.

13 November 1960	Cyprus	1 – 1	Israel	Nicosia, Cyprus
	Shialis	Report	Kofman 31'	Referee: Bajić (Yugoslavia)

27 November 1960	Israel	6 – 1	Cyprus	Ramat Gan, Israel
	Levi 14', 30', 66'; Stelmach 61', 88'; Nahari 34'	Report	Shialis	Stadium: Ramat Gan Stadium; Referee: Bajić (Yugoslavia)

Second round

Israel defeated Ethiopia to advance to the Final Round.

14 March 1961	Israel	1 – 0	Ethiopia	Ramat Gan, Israel
	Glazer 69'			Stadium: Ramat Gan Stadium; Referee: Zsolt (Hungary)

19 March 1961	Israel	3 – 2	Ethiopia	Haifa, Israel
	Glazer 27', 77'; Stelmach 59'		Mengistu; Tesfaye	Referee: Pósa (Hungary)

Final round

Israel lost to Italy in the Final Round to be eliminated.

Team	Pld	W	D	L	GF	GA	GD	Pts
Italy	2	2	0	0	10	2	+8	4
Israel	2	0	0	2	2	10	−8	0

15 October 1961	Israel	2 – 4	Italy	Ramat Gan, Israel
	Stelmach 15'; Young 38'	Report	Lojacono 53' (pen.); Altafini 79'; Corso 87', 90'	Stadium: Ramat Gan Stadium; Referee: Takow (Bulgaria)

4 November 1961	Italy	6 – 0	Israel	Turin, Italy
	Sivori 16', 52', 65', 88'; Corso 59'; Angelillo 69'	Report		Referee: Asensi Martin (Spain)

Squad

Head coach: (Hungary) Gyula Mándi

Pos.	Player	DoB	Games played	Goals	Minutes played	Sub off	Sub on	(Cyprus)	(Cyprus)	(Ethiopia)	(Ethiopia)	(Italy)	(Italy)	Club
	Aharon Amar	1937	3	0	270	0	0	90	90	90	-	-	-	(Israel) Maccabi Haifa F.C.
	Mordechai Benbinisti		6	0	540	0	0	90	90	90	90	90	90	(Israel) Hapoel Jerusalem F.C.
FW	Yehoshua Glazer	29 December 1927	2	3	180	0	0	-	-	90	90	-	-	(Israel) Maccabi Tel Aviv F.C.
	Yosef Goldstein		3	0	270	0	0	-	90	90	90	-	-	(Israel) Maccabi Tel Aviv F.C.
	Yaacov Grundman		1	0	90	0	0	-	-	-	-	90	-	(Israel) Bnei Yehuda Tel Aviv F.C.
GK	Ya'akov Hodorov	16 June 1927	2	0	180	0	0	-	-	-	-	90	90	(Israel) Hapoel Tel Aviv F.C.
	Boaz Kofman		1	1	90	0	0	90	-	-	-	-	-	(Israel) Hapoel Petah Tikva
FW	Shlomo Levi		4	3	360	0	0	90	90	90	90	-	-	(Israel) Hapoel Haifa F.C.
	Amatsia Levkovich		6	0	540	0	0	90	90	90	90	90	90	(Israel) Hapoel Tel Aviv F.C.
	Avraham Menchel	12 December 1935	5	0	450	0	0	90	90	-	90	90	90	(Israel) Maccabi Haifa F.C.
	Zvi Muisescu		2	0	180	0	0	90	90	-	-	-	-
	Shlomo Nahari		3	1	270	0	0	-	90	90	-	90	-	(Israel) Hapoel Petah Tikva
	Shalom Peterburg		1	0	90	0	0	-	-	-	-	-	90	(Israel) Hapoel Petah Tikva
FW	Zecharia Ratzabi		3	0	270	0	0	90	-	-	-	90	90	(Israel) Hapoel Petah Tikva
FW	Danny Shmulevich-Rom	29 November 1940	4	0	360	0	0	-	90	90	90	-	90	(Israel) Maccabi Haifa F.C.
FW	Nahum Stelmach	19 July 1936	5	4	450	0	0	90	90	90	-	90	90	(Israel) Hapoel Petah Tikva
	Zvi Tendler		2	0	180	0	0	-	-	-	-	90	90	(Israel) Hapoel Haifa F.C.
	Gidon Tish		5	0	450	0	0	90	-	90	90	90	90	(Israel) Hapoel Tel Aviv F.C.
GK	Yaacov Visoker		4	0	360	0	0	90	90	90	90	-	-	(Israel) Hapoel Petah Tikva
	Uri Weinberg		1	0	90	0	0	-	-	-	90	-	-	(Israel) Hapoel Haifa F.C.
	Reuven Young		3	1	270	0	0	-	-	-	90	90	90	(Israel) Hapoel Haifa F.C.

1966 FIFA World Cup qualifier

At the 1966 FIFA World Cup, Israel competed in the UEFA Group 1 qualifying round, finishing in third and last place. Israeli referee Menachem Ashkenazi also participated in the World Cup, officiating the Group 1 game between France and Mexico, as well as the Quarter-finals game between Portugal and North Korea.

Standings

Final table													Home							Away						
Rank	Team	Pld	W	D	L	GF	GA	GD	Pts	(Belgium)	(Bulgaria)	(Israel)	Pld	W	D	L	GF	GA	Pts	Pld	W	D	L	GF	GA	Pts
1.	Belgium	4	3	0	1	11	3	+8	6	X	5:0	1:0	2	2	0	0	6	0	4	2	1	0	1	5	3	2
2.	Bulgaria	4	3	0	1	9	6	+3	6	3:0	X	4:0	2	2	0	0	7	0	4	2	1	0	1	2	6	2
3.	Israel	4	0	0	4	1	12	-11	0	0:5	1:2	X	2	0	0	2	1	7	0	2	0	0	2	0	5	0

Matches

9 May 1965	Belgium	1 – 0	Israel	Heysel Stadium, Brussels, Belgium
	Jurion 24' (pen.)	Report		Attendance: 21,699; Referee: Poulsen (Denmark)

13 June 1965	Bulgaria	4 – 0	Israel	Slavia Stadium, Sofia, Bulgaria
	Kotkov 16', 39'; Asparuhov 67'; Kitov 69'	Report		Attendance: 18,770; Referee: Talu (Turkey)

10 November 1965	Israel	0 – 5	Belgium	Ramat Gan Stadium, Ramat Gan, Israel
		Report	Van Himst 24', 33', 69'; Thio 31'; Puis 48'	Attendance: 48,355; Referee: Sbardeua (Italy)

21 November 1965	Israel	1 – 2	Bulgaria	Ramat Gan Stadium, Ramat Gan, Israel
	Talbi 48'	Report	Kolev 31'; Asparuhov 81'	Attendance: 28,213; Referee: Babauczek (Austria)

Squad

Head coach: (Socialist Federal Republic of Yugoslavia) Milovan Ćirić

Pos.	Player	DoB	Games played	Goals	Minutes played	Sub off	Sub on	(Belgium)	(Bulgaria)	(Belgium)	(Bulgaria)	Club
MF	Haim Bahar	9 April 1943	3	0	270	0	0	90	-	90	90	(Israel) Hapoel Petah Tikva
DF	Menahem Bello	26 December 1947	1	0	90	0	0	-	90	-	-	(Israel) Maccabi Tel Aviv
MF	Itzhak Englander	30 April 1946	1	0	90	0	0	-	-	90	-	(Israel) Hapoel Haifa
FW	Yehezkel Hazum	1947	1	0	90	0	0	-	-	90	-	(Israel) Hapoel Tel Aviv F.C.
FW	Boaz Kofman	23 May 1935	2	0	180	0	0	-	90	-	90	(Israel) Hapoel Petah Tikva
DF	Moshe Leon	1944	3	0	270	0	0	90	-	90	90	(Israel) Maccabi Jaffa
GK	Haim Levin	3 March 1937	3	0	270	0	0	90	90	90	-	(Israel) Maccabi Tel Aviv
DF	Amatsia Levkovich	September 1938	2	0	180	0	0	90	90	-	-	(Israel) Hapoel Tel Aviv
FW	Yosef Mahalal	1939	1	0	90	0	0	-	-	90	-	(Israel) Bnei Yehuda Tel Aviv
GK	Yair Nosovski	29 June 1937	1	0	90	0	0	-	-	-	90	(Israel) Hapoel Kfar Saba
MF	Haim Nurieli	1943	1	0	90	0	0	90	-	-	-	(Israel) Hapoel Tel Aviv
DF	David Primo	5 May 1946	4	0	360	0	0	90	90	90	90	(Israel) Hapoel Tel Aviv
FW	Moshe Romano	1946	1	0	90	0	0	-	-	-	90	(Israel) Shimshon Tel Aviv
MF	Shmuel Rosenthal	22 April 1947	3	0	270	0	0	-	90	90	90	(Israel) Hapoel Petah Tikva F.C.
MF	Danny Shmulevich-Rom	29 November 1940	4	0	360	0	0	90	90	90	90	(Israel) Maccabi Haifa
MF	Giora Spiegel	27 July 1947	1	0	90	0	0	-	-	-	90	(Israel) Maccabi Tel Aviv
FW	Mordechai Spiegler	19 August 1944	3	0	270	0	0	90	90	90	-	(Israel) Maccabi Netanya
FW	Nahum Stelmach	19 July 1936	2	0	180	0	0	90	90	-	-	(Israel) Hapoel Petah Tikva
MF	Rahamim Talbi	17 May 1943	3	1	270	0	0	-	90	90	90	(Israel) Maccabi Tel Aviv
MF	Reuven Young	15 May 1942	3	0	270	0	0	90	90	-	90	(Israel) Hapoel Haifa
FW	Gadi Zelniker	12 March 1944	1	0	90	0	0	90	-	-	-	(Israel) Hakoah Ramat Gan

1974 FIFA World Cup qualifier

At the 1974 FIFA World Cup, Israel competed in the AFC and OFC qualifying round, losing in the Zone A finals. The 1974 World Cup was Israel's last as an official member of the AFC, as they resigned the Asian Games Federation in 1974.

Classification matches

Based on the results of the classification match Israel was assigned to Group 2 with Thailand and Malaysia.

16 May 1973	Israel	2 – 1	Japan	Dongdaemun Stadium, Seoul
19:45 KST (UTC+09)	Mordechai Spiegler 5'; Moshe Onana 61'		Shusaku Hirasawa 27'	Attendance: 25,000; Referee: Boskovic (Australia)

Group 2

Israel finished in first place in Group 2, moving on to the semi-finals with South Korea.

Standings

Pos	Team	Pld	W	D	L	GF	GA	GD	Pts
1	Israel	3	2	1	0	9	0	+9	5
2	South Korea	3	1	2	0	4	0	+4	4
3	Malaysia	3	1	1	1	2	3	−1	3
4	Thailand	3	0	0	3	0	12	−12	0

Matches

19 May 1973	Israel	3 – 0	Malaysia	Dongdaemun Stadium, Seoul
17:25 KST (UTC+09)	Farkas 50'; Itzhak Shum 62'; Moshe Onana 82'			Attendance: 30,000; Referee: Aing Kim Ean (Khmer Republic)

21 May 1973	Israel	6 – 0	Thailand	Dongdaemun Stadium, Seoul
18:00 KST (UTC+09)	George Borba 12'; Mordechai Spiegler 62'; Itzhak Shum 69'; Zvi Rozen 73', 84'; Moshe Onana 78'			Attendance: 35,000; Referee: Dhillon (Singapore)

23 May 1973	South Korea	0 – 0	Israel	Dongdaemun Stadium, Seoul
19:45 KST (UTC+09)				Attendance: 40,000; Referee: U Tin Thut (Burma)

Semi-finals

Israel, defeating Japan in the semi-finals, advanced to the Zone A finals to face South Korea.

26 May 1973	Israel	1 – 0 (a.e.t.)	Japan	Dongdaemun Stadium, Seoul
16:45 KST (UTC+09)	Moshe Onana 110'			Attendance: 35,000; Referee: Dhillon (Singapore)

Finals

In the Zone A finals, Israel lost to South Korea, who moved on to the AFC/OFC Final round.

28 May 1973	South Korea	1 – 0 (a.e.t.)	Israel	Dongdaemun Stadium, Seoul
19:00 KST (UTC+09)	Cha Bum-Kun 109'			Attendance: 40,000; Referee: U Tin Thut (Burma)

1978 FIFA World Cup qualifier

At the 1978 FIFA World Cup, Israel competed in the AFC and OFC Group 2 qualifying round, finishing in second place. Israel, despite resigning the Asian Games Federation in 1974, was still assigned to compete in the AFC and OFC qualifying round.

Additionally Israeli referee, Abraham Klein, worked games in Group 1, Group A and the match for third place.

Standings

Pos	Team	Pld	W	D	L	GF	GA	GD	Pts
1	South Korea	4	2	2	0	4	1	+3	6
2	Israel	4	2	1	1	5	3	+2	5
3	Japan	4	0	1	3	0	5	−5	1
—	North Korea (W)	0	0	0	0	0	0	0	0

(W) Withdrew

Matches

27 February 1977	Israel	0 – 0	South Korea	Ramat Gan, Israel
				Stadium: Ramat Gan Stadium; Referee: McGinlay (Scotland)

6 March 1977	Israel	2 – 0	Japan	Ramat Gan, Israel
				Stadium: Ramat Gan Stadium; Referee: Kitabdjian (France)

10 March 1977	Japan	0 – 2	Israel	Ramat Gan, Israel
				Stadium: Ramat Gan Stadium; Referee: Verbeke (France)

20 March 1977	South Korea	3 – 1	Israel	Seoul, Korea Republic
	Cha Bum-Kun 23'; Park Sang-In 86'; Choi Chong-Dock 88'		Malmillian 76'

1982 FIFA World Cup qualifier

At the 1982 FIFA World Cup, Israel competed in the UEFA Group 6 qualifying round, finishing in fifth and last place.

Israel was previously part of the Asian Games Federation until it was disbanded in 1981. In 1982 Israel was barred joining the new Olympic Council of Asia, Israel opted to join the European Olympic Committees in the early 1990s. The 1982 World Cup Israel was not yet part of the continent group, however was assigned to it.

Standings

Pos	Team	Pld	W	D	L	GF	GA	GD	Pts
1	Scotland	8	4	3	1	9	4	+5	11
2	Northern Ireland	8	3	3	2	6	3	+3	9
3	Sweden	8	3	2	3	7	8	−1	8
4	Portugal	8	3	1	4	8	11	−3	7
5	Israel	8	1	3	4	6	10	−4	5

Matches

26 March 1980	Israel	0 – 0	Northern Ireland	Ramat Gan Stadium, Ramat Gan
		Report		Attendance: 40,000; Referee: Stjepan Glavina (Yugoslavia)

18 June 1980	Sweden	1 – 1	Israel	Råsunda Stadium, Solna
	Ramberg 35'	Report	Damti 80'	Attendance: 39,831; Referee: Martti Hirviniemi (Finland)

12 November 1980	Israel	0 – 0	Sweden	Ramat Gan Stadium, Ramat Gan
		Report		Attendance: 45,000; Referee: George Courtney (England)

17 December 1980	Portugal	3 – 0	Israel	Estádio da Luz, Lisbon
	Coelho 33', 72'; Jordão 36'	Report		Attendance: 60,000; Referee: Enzo Barbaresco (Italy)

25 February 1981	Israel	0 – 1	Scotland	Ramat Gan Stadium, Ramat Gan
		Report	Dalglish 54'	Attendance: 45,000; Referee: Otto Anderco (Romania)

28 April 1981	Scotland	3 – 1	Israel	Hampden Park‚ Glasgow
	Robertson 21' (pen.), 30' (pen.); Provan 54'	Report	Sinai 56'	Attendance: 60,000; Referee: Gudmundur Haraldsson (Iceland)

28 October 1981	Israel	4 – 1	Portugal	Ramat Gan Stadium, Ramat Gan
	Tabak 6', 18', 30'; Damti 14'	Report	Jordão 8'	Attendance: 25,000; Referee: Sotou Afxentiou (Cyprus)

18 November 1981	Northern Ireland	1 – 0	Israel	Windsor Park, Belfast
	Armstrong 27'	Report		Attendance: 40,000; Referee: Emilio Guruceta Muro (Spain)

Goalscorers
3 goals

- Benny Tabak

2 goals

- Gidi Damti

1 goal

- Moshe Sinai
1986 FIFA World Cup qualifier

At the 1986 FIFA World Cup, Israel competed in the OFC qualification round, finishing in second place.

Israel was previously part of the Asian Games Federation until it was disbanded in 1981. In 1982 Israel was barred joining the new Olympic Council of Asia, Israel opted to join the European Olympic Committees in the early 1990s. The 1986 World Cup Israel was not yet part of a continent group, therefore joining OFC.

Standings

Pos	Team	Pld	W	D	L	GF	GA	GD	Pts	Qualification	Australia	Israel	New Zealand	Chinese Taipei for Olympic games
1	Australia	6	4	2	0	20	2	+18	10	Advance to Inter-confederation play-offs	—	1–1	2–0	8–0
2	Israel	6	3	1	2	17	6	+11	7		1–2	—	3–0	5–0
3	New Zealand	6	3	1	2	13	7	+6	7		0–0	3–1	—	5–0
4	Chinese Taipei	6	0	0	6	1	36	−35	0		0–7	0–6	1–5	—

Source: RSSSF

Matches

3 September 1985	Chinese Taipei	0–6	Israel	Ramat Gan, Israel
			28', 35', 74' Turk; 39' Armeli; 53', 90' Malmilian	Stadium: Ramat Gan Stadium; Attendance: 30,000; Referee: Mircea Salomir (Romania)

8 September 1985	Israel	5–0	Chinese Taipei	Ramat Gan, Israel
	Cohen 7'; Armeli 18'; Ohana 56', 72', 79'			Stadium: Ramat Gan Stadium; Attendance: 10,000; Referee: Ioan Igna (Romania)

8 October 1985	Israel	1–2	Australia	Ramat Gan, Israel
	Armeli 65'		46' Mitchell; 50' Kosmina	Stadium: Ramat Gan Stadium; Attendance: 45,000; Referee: Luigi Agnolin (Italy)

20 October 1985	Australia	1–1	Israel	Melbourne, Australia
	Ratcliffe 32'		47' Cohen	Stadium: Olympic Park; Attendance: 27,000; Referee: José Rosa dos Santos (Portugal)

26 October 1985	New Zealand	3–1	Israel	Auckland, New Zealand
	Rufer 3'; Dunford 30'; Walker 67'		23' Armeli	Stadium: Mount Smart Stadium; Attendance: 10,600; Referee: Egbert Mulder (Netherlands)

10 November 1985	Israel	3–0	New Zealand	Ramat Gan, Israel
	Cohen 67'; Selecter 75'; Armeli 85'			Stadium: Ramat Gan Stadium; Attendance: 4,500; Referee: Dieter Pauly (West Germany)

Goalscorers
5 goals

- Zahi Armeli

3 goals

- Rifaat Turk
- Avi Cohen
- Eli Ohana

2 goals

- Uri Malmilian

1 goal

- Moshe Selecter
1990 FIFA World Cup qualifier

At the 1990 FIFA World Cup, Israel competed in the OFC qualification round, finishing in first place. Israel went on to face Colombia in the CONMBOL vs. OFC playoff, losing 1–0.

Israel was previously part of the Asian Games Federation until it was disbanded in 1981. In 1982 Israel was barred joining the new Olympic Council of Asia, Israel opted to join the European Olympic Committees in the early 1990s. The 1990 World Cup Israel was not yet part of a continent group, therefore joining OFC.

OFC qualification

Round 1

In round 1, Israel received a bye and advanced to the final round directly. The remaining four teams were paired up to play knockout matches on a home-and-away basis. The winners would advance to the Second Round.

Round 2

In round 2 Israel competed against Australia and New Zealand, finishing in first place.

Pos	Team	Pld	W	D	L	GF	GA	GD	Pts	Qualification	Israel	Australia	New Zealand
1	Israel	4	1	3	0	5	4	+1	5	Advance to Inter-confederation play-offs	—	1–1	1–0
2	Australia	4	1	2	1	6	5	+1	4		1–1	—	4–1
3	New Zealand	4	1	1	2	5	7	−2	3		2–2	2–0	—

Source: RSSSF

5 March 1989	Israel	1–0	New Zealand	Ramat Gan, Israel
	Rosenthal 7'			Stadium: Ramat Gan Stadium; Attendance: 44,500; Referee: Serge Muhmenthaler (Switzerland)

19 March 1989	Israel	1–1	Australia	Ramat Gan, Israel
	Ohana 67' (pen.)		72' Yankos	Stadium: Ramat Gan Stadium; Attendance: 45,000; Referee: Manfred Neuner (West Germany)

9 April 1989	New Zealand	2–2	Israel	Auckland, New Zealand
	Wright 19'; Dunford 35'		16' Rosenthal; 37' Klinger	Stadium: Mount Smart Stadium; Attendance: 3,200; Referee: Claude Bouillet (France)

16 April 1989	Australia	1–1	Israel	Sydney, Australia
	Trimboli 88'		40' Ohana	Stadium: Sydney Football Stadium; Attendance: 40,320; Referee: Carlo Longhi (Italy)

Goal Scorers

2 goals

- Ronny Rosenthal
- Eli Ohana

1 goal

- Nir Klinger

CONMEBOL vs OFC playoff

Israel, as the winning team of the OFC qualification tournament played the CONMEBOL group winner with the weakest record in a home-and-away play-off. The winner of this play-off qualified for the 1990 FIFA World Cup.

Team 1	Agg.	Team 2	1st leg	2nd leg
Colombia	1–0	Israel	1–0	0–0

15 October 1989	Colombia	1–0	Israel	Estadio Metropolitano Roberto Meléndez, Barranquilla
15:30 UTC–5	Usuriaga 73'			Attendance: 65,000; Referee: Michel Vautrot (France)

30 October 1989	Israel	0–0	Colombia	Ramat Gan Stadium, Ramat Gan
19:00 UTC+2				Attendance: 50,000; Referee: Edgardo Codesal (Mexico)

1994 FIFA World Cup qualifier

At the 1994 FIFA World Cup, Israel competed in the UEFA Group 6 qualifying round, finishing in sixth and last place. Israel was previously part of the Asian Games Federation until it was disbanded in 1981. In 1982 Israel was barred joining the new Olympic Council of Asia, Israel opted to join the European Olympic Committees in the early 1990s. The 1994 World Cup was the first in which Israel competed in Europe.

Standings

Team	Pld	W	D	L	GF	GA	GD	Pts
Sweden	10	6	3	1	19	8	+11	15
Bulgaria	10	6	2	2	19	10	+9	14
France	10	6	1	3	17	10	+7	13
Austria	10	3	2	5	15	16	−1	8
Finland	10	2	1	7	9	18	−9	5
Israel	10	1	3	6	10	27	−17	5

Matches

28 October 1992	Austria	5–2	Israel	Prater Stadium, Vienna
	Herzog 41', 46'; Polster 49'; Stöger 56'; A. Ogris 87'	Report	Zohar 57', 77'	Attendance: 12,000; Referee: João Pinto Correia (Portugal)

11 November 1992	Israel	1–3	Sweden	Ramat Gan Stadium, Ramat Gan
	Banin 42'	Report	Limpar 37'; Dahlin 58'; Ingesson 74'	Attendance: 25,230; Referee: Serge Muhmenthaler (Switzerland)

2 December 1992	Israel	0–2	Bulgaria	Ramat Gan Stadium, Ramat Gan
		Report	Sirakov 56'; Penev 83'	Attendance: 15,000; Referee: Vassilios Nikakis (Greece)

17 February 1993	Israel	0–4	France	Ramat Gan Stadium, Ramat Gan
		Report	Cantona 28'; Blanc 62', 84'; Roche 89'	Attendance: 26,000; Referee: Ryszard Wójcik (Poland)

12 May 1993	Bulgaria	2–2	Israel	Vasil Levski National Stadium, Sofia
	Stoichkov 35' (pen.); Sirakov 60'	Report	R. Harazi 52'; Rosenthal 53'	Attendance: 25,000; Referee: Ahmet Çakar (Turkey)

2 June 1993	Sweden	5–0	Israel	Råsunda, Solna
	Brolin 17', 41', 65'; Zetterberg 55'; Landberg 89'	Report		Attendance: 22,042; Referee: Sergei Khusainov (Russia)

16 June 1993	Finland	0–0	Israel	Lahti Stadium, Lahti
		Report		Attendance: 4,620; Referee: Volodymyr Pyanykh (Ukraine)

13 October 1993	France	2–3	Israel	Parc des Princes, Paris
	Sauzée 32'; Ginola 43'	Report	R. Harazi 21'; Berkovich 83'; Atar 90'	Attendance: 32,700; Referee: Alan Snoddy (Northern Ireland)

27 October 1993	Israel	1–1	Austria	Ramat Gan Stadium, Ramat Gan
	Rosenthal 3'	Report	Reinmayr 15'	Attendance: 23,500; Referee: László Vágner (Hungary)

10 November 1993	Israel	1–3	Finland	Ramat Gan Stadium, Ramat Gan
	R. Harazi 90'	Report	Hyryläinen 54', 85'; Hjelm 73'	Attendance: 10,000; Referee: Daniel Roduit (Switzerland)

Goalscorers

3 goals

- Ronen Harazi

2 goals

- Itzik Zohar
- Ronny Rosenthal

1 goal

- Tal Banin
- Eyal Berkovic
- Reuven Atar
1998 FIFA World Cup qualifier

At the 1998 FIFA World Cup, Israel competed in the UEFA Group 5 qualifying round, finishing in third place.

Standings

Pos	Team	Pld	W	D	L	GF	GA	GD	Pts
1	Bulgaria	8	6	0	2	18	9	+9	18
2	Russia	8	5	2	1	19	5	+14	17
3	Israel	8	4	1	3	9	7	+2	13
4	Cyprus	8	3	1	4	10	15	−5	10
5	Luxembourg	8	0	0	8	2	22	−20	0

Matches

1 September 1996	Israel	2–1	Bulgaria	Ramat Gan Stadium, Ramat Gan
18:00 UTC+3	Harazi 34'; Banin 62'	Report	Balakov 3' (pen.)	Attendance: 13,200; Referee: Alfredo Trentalange (Italy)

9 October 1996	Israel	1–1	Russia	Ramat Gan Stadium, Ramat Gan
18:00 UTC+3	Brumer 65'	Report	Kolyvanov 82'	Attendance: 32,000; Referee: Marc Batta (France)

10 November 1996	Cyprus	2–0	Israel	Tsirion, Limassol
18:00 UTC+2	Gogić 9', 15' (pen.)	Report		Attendance: 10,500; Referee: Gheorghe Constantin (Romania)

15 December 1996	Israel	1–0	Luxembourg	Ramat Gan Stadium, Ramat Gan
18:00 UTC+2	Ohana 39'	Report		Attendance: 24,400; Referee: John Ashman (Wales)

31 March 1997	Luxembourg	0–3	Israel	Stade Josy Barthel, Luxembourg City
17:00 UTC+2		Report	Zohar 11', 79'; Banin 86' (pen.)	Attendance: 6,607; Referee: René Temmink (Netherlands)

30 April 1997	Israel	2–0	Cyprus	Ramat Gan Stadium, Ramat Gan
18:00 UTC+3	Ohana 3', 72'	Report		Attendance: 32,000; Referee: Vasyl Melnychuk (Ukraine)

8 June 1997	Russia	2–0	Israel	Dinamo, Moscow
19:00 UTC+3	Radimov 8'; Kosolapov 38'	Report		Attendance: 22,000; Referee: Gerd Grabher (Austria)

20 August 1997	Bulgaria	1–0	Israel	Vasil Levski National Stadium, Sofia
20:00 UTC+3	Penev 65'	Report		Attendance: 32,000; Referee: Sándor Piller (Hungary)

Goalscorers

3 goals

- Eli Ohana

2 goals

- Tal Banin
- Itzik Zohar

1 goal

- Ronen Harazi
- Gadi Brumer
2002 FIFA World Cup qualifier

At the 2002 FIFA World Cup, Israel competed in the UEFA Group 7 qualifying round, finishing in third place.

Standings

Final table															Home							Away						
Rank	Team	Pld	W	D	L	GF	GA	GD	Pts	(Spain)	(Austria)	(Israel)	(Bosnia and Herzegovina)	(Liechtenstein)	Pld	W	D	L	GF	GA	Pts	Pld	W	D	L	GF	GA	Pts
1.	Spain	8	6	2	0	21	4	+17	20	-	4:0	2:0	4:1	5:0	4	4	0	0	15	1	12	4	2	2	0	6	3	8
2.	Austria	8	4	3	1	10	8	+2	15	1:1	-	2:1	2:0	2:0	4	3	1	0	7	2	10	4	1	2	1	3	6	5
3.	Israel	8	3	3	2	11	7	+4	12	1:1	1:1	-	3:1	2:0	4	2	2	0	7	3	8	4	1	1	2	4	4	4
4.	Bosnia and Herzegovina	8	2	2	4	12	12	0	8	1:2	1:1	0:0	-	5:0	4	1	2	1	7	3	5	4	1	0	3	5	9	3
5.	Liechtenstein	8	0	0	8	0	23	-23	0	0:2	0:1	0:3	0:3	-	4	0	0	4	0	9	0	4	0	0	4	0	14	0

Matches

3 September 2000	Israel	2–0	Liechtenstein	Ramat Gan Stadium, Ramat Gan
20:20 UTC+3	Mizrahi 1'; Balili 80'	Report		Referee: Richard O'Hanlon (Ireland)

7 October 2000	Spain	2–0	Israel	Santiago Bernabéu, Madrid
21:30 UTC+2	Gerard 20'; Hierro 54'	Report		Referee: Claude Colombo (France)

11 October 2000	Israel	3–1	Bosnia and Herzegovina	Ramat Gan Stadium, Ramat Gan
19:25 UTC+2	Berkovich 12'; Abuksis 62'; Katan 76'	Report	Akrapović 48'	Referee: Dick Jol (Netherlands)

28 March 2001	Austria	2–1	Israel	Ernst-Happel-Stadion, Vienna
20:30 UTC+2	Baur 9'; Herzog 42' (pen.)	Report	Baur 6' (o.g.)	Referee: Alfredo Trentalange (Italy)

2 June 2001	Liechtenstein	0–3	Israel	Rheinpark, Vaduz
19:00 UTC+2		Report	Revivo 3'; Tal 7'; Nimni 18'	Referee: Lassin Isaksen (Faroe Islands)

6 June 2001	Israel	1–1	Spain	Ramat Gan Stadium, Ramat Gan
20:00 UTC+3	Revivo 4'	Report	Raúl 63'	Referee: Anders Frisk (Sweden)

1 September 2001	Bosnia and Herzegovina	0–0	Israel	Koševo, Sarajevo
20:15 UTC+2		Report		Referee: Dieter Schoch (Switzerland)

27 October 2001	Israel	1–1	Austria	Ramat Gan Stadium, Ramat Gan
19:30 UTC+2	Gershon 55' (pen.)	Report	Herzog 90+1'	Referee: Vítor Melo Pereira (Portugal)

Goalscorers

2 goals

- Haim Revivo

1 goal

- Yossi Abuksis
- Pini Balili
- Eyal Berkovich
- Yaniv Katan
- Alon Mizrahi
- Avi Nimni
- Idan Tal
- Shimon Gershon
- Michael Baur
2006 FIFA World Cup qualifier

At the 2006 FIFA World Cup, Israel competed in the UEFA Group 4 qualifying round, finishing in third place.

Standings

Legend
Group winners and two best runners-up among all groups directly qualified for the finals
Remaining group runners-up advanced to the play-offs

Team	Pld	W	D	L	GF	GA	GD	Pts	France national football team	Switzerland national football team	Israel national football team	Republic of Ireland national football team	Cyprus national football team	Faroe Islands national football team
France	10	5	5	0	14	2	+12	20		0–0	0–0	0–0	4–0	3–0
Switzerland	10	4	6	0	18	7	+11	18	1–1		1–1	1–1	1–0	6–0
Israel	10	4	6	0	15	10	+5	18	1–1	2–2		1–1	2–1	2–1
Republic of Ireland	10	4	5	1	12	5	+7	17	0–1	0–0	2–2		3–0	2–0
Cyprus	10	1	1	8	8	20	−12	4	0–2	1–3	1–2	0–1		2–2
Faroe Islands	10	0	1	9	4	27	−23	1	0–2	1–3	0–2	0–2	0–3	

Matches

2004-09-04	France	0–0	Israel	Stade de France, Saint-Denis
21:00		(Report)		Attendance: 43,527; Referee: René Temmink (Netherlands)

2004-09-08	Israel	2–1	Cyprus	Ramat Gan Stadium, Ramat Gan
20:50	Benayoun 64'; Badir 75'	(Report)	Konstantinou 59'	Attendance: 21,872; Referee: Sergey Shmolik (Belarus)

2004-10-09	Israel	2–2	Switzerland	Ramat Gan Stadium, Ramat Gan
20:05	Benayoun 9', 48'	(Report)	Frei 26'; Vonlanthen 34'	Attendance: 37,976; Referee: Mark Shield (Australia)

2004-11-17	Cyprus	1–2	Israel	GSP Stadium, Nicosia
19:00	Okkas 45'	(Report)	Keisi 17'; Nimni 86'	Attendance: 1,624; Referee: Sten Kaldma (Estonia)

2005-03-26	Israel	1–1	Republic of Ireland	Ramat Gan Stadium, Ramat Gan
19:50	Abbas Souan 90'	(Report)	Morrison 43'	Attendance: 32,150; Referee: Valentin Ivanov (Russia)

2005-03-30	Israel	1–1	France	Ramat Gan Stadium, Ramat Gan
20:50	Badir 83'	(Report)	Trezeguet 50'	Attendance: 32,150; Referee: Markus Merk (Germany)

2005-06-04	Republic of Ireland	2–2	Israel	Lansdowne Road, Dublin
19:30	Harte 5'; Keane 11'	(Report)	Avi Yehiel 39'; Avi Nimni 45+1'	Attendance: 36,000; Referee: Kyros Vassaras (Greece)

2005-09-03	Switzerland	1–1	Israel	St. Jakob-Park, Basel
17:30	Frei 6'	(Report)	Keisi 20'	Attendance: 30,000; Referee: Roberto Rosetti (Italy)

2005-09-07	Faroe Islands	0–2	Israel	Tórsvøllur, Tórshavn
18:00		(Report)	Nimni 54'; Katan 79'	Attendance: 2,240; Referee: Pieter Vink (Netherlands)

2005-10-08	Israel	2–1	Faroe Islands	Ramat Gan Stadium, Ramat Gan
21:10	Benayoun 1'; Zandberg 90+1'	(Report)	Samuelsen 90+3'	Attendance: 31,857; Referee: Bernhard Brugger (Austria)

Goalscorers

4 goals

- Yossi Benayoun

3 goals

- Adoram Keisi
- Avi Nimni

2 goals

- Walid Badir

1 goal

- Michael Zandberg
- Yaniv Katan
- Avi Yehiel
- Abbas Suan
2010 FIFA World Cup qualifier

At the 2010 FIFA World Cup, Israel competed in the UEFA Group 2 qualifying round, finishing in fourth place.

Standings

Pos	Team	Pld	W	D	L	GF	GA	GD	Pts	Qualification
1	Switzerland	10	6	3	1	18	8	+10	21	Qualification to 2010 FIFA World Cup
2	Greece	10	6	2	2	20	10	+10	20	Advance to second round
3	Latvia	10	5	2	3	18	15	+3	17	
4	Israel	10	4	4	2	20	10	+10	16	
5	Luxembourg	10	1	2	7	4	25	−21	5	
6	Moldova	10	0	3	7	6	18	−12	3	

Matches

The match schedule was established at a meeting in Israel on 8 January 2008.

6 September 2008	Israel	2–2	Switzerland	Ramat Gan Stadium, Ramat Gan
20:55 UTC+3	Benayoun 73'; Sahar 90+2'	Report	Yakin 45'; Nkufo 56'	Attendance: 29,600; Referee: Martin Hansson (Sweden)

10 September 2008	Moldova	1–2	Israel	Zimbru Stadium, Chişinău
20:30 UTC+3	Picusceac 1'	Report	Golan 39'; Saban 45'	Attendance: 10,500; Referee: César Muñiz Fernández (Spain)

11 October 2008	Luxembourg	1–3	Israel	Stade Josy Barthel, Luxembourg
20:15 UTC+2	Peters 14'	Report	Benayoun 2' (pen.); Golan 54'; Tuama 81'	Attendance: 3,562; Referee: Igor Egorov (Russia)

15 October 2008	Latvia	1–1	Israel	Skonto Stadions, Riga
19:00 UTC+3	Koļesņičenko 89'	Report	Benayoun 50'	Attendance: 7,100; Referee: Vladimír Hriňák (Slovakia)

28 March 2009	Israel	1–1	Greece	Ramat Gan Stadium, Ramat Gan
21:00 UTC+2	Golan 55'	Report	Gekas 42'	Attendance: 38,000; Referee: Roberto Rosetti (Italy)

1 April 2009	Greece	2–1	Israel	Pankritio Stadium, Heraklion
21:30 UTC+3	Salpingidis 32'; Samaras 67' (pen.)	Report	Barda 60'	Attendance: 22,794; Referee: Olegário Benquerença (Portugal)

5 September 2009	Israel	0–1	Latvia	Ramat Gan Stadium, Ramat Gan
21:00 UTC+3		Report	Gorkšs 59'	Attendance: 20,000; Referee: Knut Kircher (Germany)

9 September 2009	Israel	7–0	Luxembourg	Ramat Gan Stadium, Ramat Gan
21:00 UTC+3	Barda 9', 21', 43'; Baruchyan 15'; Golan 58'; Sahar 62', 84'	Report		Attendance: 7,038; Referee: Michael Svendsen (Denmark)

10 October 2009	Israel	3–1	Moldova	Ramat Gan Stadium, Ramat Gan
21:00 UTC+2	Barda 22', 70'; Ben Dayan 65'	Report	Calincov 90+2'	Attendance: 8,700; Referee: Kevin Blom (Netherlands)

14 October 2009	Switzerland	0–0	Israel	St. Jakob-Park, Basel
20:00 UTC+2		Report		Attendance: 38,500; Referee: Alexandru Tudor (Romania)

Goalscorers
6 goals

- Elyaniv Barda

4 goals

- Omer Golan

3 goals

- Yossi Benayoun
- Ben Sahar

1 goal

- Aviram Baruchyan
- David Ben Dayan
- Klemi Saban
- Salim Tuama

Attendance

Team	Highest	Lowest	Average
Israel	38,000	7,038	20,668

2014 FIFA World Cup qualifier

At the 2014 FIFA World Cup, Israel competed in the UEFA Group F qualifying round, finishing in third place.

Standings

Pos	Team	Pld	W	D	L	GF	GA	GD	Pts	Qualification	Russia national football team	Portugal national football team	Israel national football team	Azerbaijan national football team	Northern Ireland national football team	Luxembourg national football team
1	Russia	10	7	1	2	20	5	+15	22	Qualification to 2014 FIFA World Cup	—	1–0	3–1	1–0	2–0	4–1
2	Portugal	10	6	3	1	20	9	+11	21	Advance to second round	1–0	—	1–1	3–0	1–1	3–0
3	Israel	10	3	5	2	19	14	+5	14		0–4	3–3	—	1–1	1–1	3–0
4	Azerbaijan	10	1	6	3	7	11	−4	9		1–1	0–2	1–1	—	2–0	1–1
5	Northern Ireland	10	1	4	5	9	17	−8	7		1–0	2–4	0–2	1–1	—	1–1
6	Luxembourg	10	1	3	6	7	26	−19	6		0–4	1–2	0–6	0–0	3–2	—

Winner qualified directly for the 2014 FIFA World Cup
Runner-up (ranked as one of the eight best runners-up among all nine groups) advanced to the play-offs

Matches

The match schedule was determined at a meeting in Luxembourg City, Luxembourg, on 25 November 2011.

7 September 2012	Azerbaijan	1–1	Israel	Tofiq Bahramov Republican Stadium, Baku
21:00 UTC+5	Abishov 65'	Report	Natcho 50'	Attendance: 22,211; Referee: Matej Jug (Slovenia)

11 September 2012	Israel	0–4	Russia	Ramat Gan Stadium, Ramat Gan
20:00 UTC+3		Report	Kerzhakov 7', 64'; Kokorin 18'; Fayzulin 78'	Attendance: 28,131; Referee: Mark Clattenburg (England)

12 October 2012	Luxembourg	0–6	Israel	Stade Josy Barthel, Luxembourg
21:00 UTC+2		Report	Radi 4'; Ben Basat 12'; Hemed 27', 74', 90+1'; Melikson 61'	Attendance: 2,631; Referee: Leontios Trattou (Cyprus)

16 October 2012	Israel	3–0	Luxembourg	Ramat Gan Stadium, Ramat Gan
18:00 UTC+2	Hemed 13', 48'; Ben Basat 35'	Report		Attendance: 20,400; Referee: Harald Lechner (Austria)

22 March 2013	Israel	3–3	Portugal	Ramat Gan Stadium, Ramat Gan
14:45 UTC+2	Hemed 24'; Ben Basat 40'; Gershon 70'	Report	Alves 2'; Postiga 72'; Coentrão 90+3'	Attendance: 38,600; Referee: Stéphane Lannoy (France)

26 March 2013	Northern Ireland	0–2	Israel	Windsor Park, Belfast
19:45 UTC±0		Report	Refaelov 77'; Ben Basat 84'	Attendance: 11,200; Referee: Hannes Kaasik (Estonia)

7 September 2013	Israel	1–1	Azerbaijan	Ramat Gan Stadium, Ramat Gan
20:45 UTC+3	Shechter 73'	Report	Amirguliyev 61'	Attendance: 21,250; Referee: Stefan Johannesson (Sweden)

10 September 2013	Russia	3–1	Israel	Petrovsky Stadium, Saint Petersburg
19:00 UTC+4	V. Berezutski 49'; Kokorin 52'; Glushakov 74'	Report	Zahavi 90+3'	Attendance: 21,107; Referee: Manuel Gräfe (Germany)

11 October 2013	Portugal	1–1	Israel	Estádio José Alvalade, Lisbon
20:45 UTC+1	Costa 28'	Report	Ben Basat 85'	Attendance: 48,317; Referee: Tom Harald Hagen (Norway)

15 October 2013	Israel	1–1	Northern Ireland	Ramat Gan Stadium, Ramat Gan
20:00 UTC+3	Ben Basat 43'	Report	Davis 72'	Attendance: 12,785; Referee: Laurent Duhamel (France)

Goalscorers

6 goals

- Eden Ben Basat
- Tomer Hemed

1 goal

- Rami Gershon
- Maor Melikson
- Bibras Natcho
- Maharan Radi
- Lior Refaelov
- Itay Shechter
- Eran Zahavi
2018 FIFA World Cup qualifier

At the 2018 FIFA World Cup, Israel competed in the UEFA Group G qualifying round, finishing in fourth place.

Standings

Pos	Team	Pld	W	D	L	GF	GA	GD	Pts	Qualification	Spain	Italy	Albania	Israel	North Macedonia	Liechtenstein
1	Spain	10	9	1	0	36	3	+33	28	Qualification to 2018 FIFA World Cup	—	3–0	3–0	4–1	4–0	8–0
2	Italy	10	7	2	1	21	8	+13	23	Advance to second round	1–1	—	2–0	1–0	1–1	5–0
3	Albania	10	4	1	5	10	13	−3	13		0–2	0–1	—	0–3	2–1	2–0
4	Israel	10	4	0	6	10	15	−5	12		0–1	1–3	0–3	—	0–1	2–1
5	Macedonia	10	3	2	5	15	15	0	11		1–2	2–3	1–1	1–2	—	4–0
6	Liechtenstein	10	0	0	10	1	39	−38	0		0–8	0–4	0–2	0–1	0–3	—

Source: FIFA
Rules for classification: Qualification tiebreakers
Winner qualified directly for the 2018 FIFA World Cup
Runner-up (ranked as one of the eight best runners-up among all nine groups) advanced to the play-offs

Matches

The match schedule was determined on 26 July 2015.

5 September 2016	Israel	1–3	Italy	Sammy Ofer Stadium, Haifa
21:45 UTC+3	Ben Haim II 35'	Report	Pellè 14'; Candreva 31' (pen.); Immobile 83'	Attendance: 29,300; Referee: Sergei Karasev (Russia)

6 October 2016	North Macedonia	1–2	Israel	Philip II Arena, Skopje
20:45 UTC+2	Nestorovski 63'	Report	Hemed 25'; Ben Haim II 43'	Attendance: 6,500; Referee: Andre Marriner (England)

9 October 2016	Israel	2–1	Liechtenstein	Teddy Stadium, Jerusalem
19:00 UTC+3	Hemed 4', 16'	Report	Göppel 49'	Attendance: 9,000; Referee: Clayton Pisani (Malta)

12 November 2016	Albania	0–3	Israel	Elbasan Arena, Elbasan
20:45 UTC+1		Report	Zahavi 18' (pen.); Einbinder 66'; Atar 83'	Attendance: 7,600; Referee: Deniz Aytekin (Germany)

24 March 2017	Spain	4–1	Israel	El Molinón, Gijón
20:45 UTC+1	Silva 13'; Vitolo 45+1'; Costa 51'; Isco 88'	Report	Refaelov 76'	Attendance: 20,321; Referee: Michael Oliver (England)

11 June 2017	Israel	0–3	Albania	Sammy Ofer Stadium, Haifa
21:45 UTC+3		Report	Sadiku 22', 44'; Memushaj 71'	Attendance: 15,150; Referee: Aleksei Kulbakov (Belarus)

2 September 2017	Israel	0–1	North Macedonia	Sammy Ofer Stadium, Haifa
21:45 UTC+3		Report	Pandev 73'	Attendance: 11,350; Referee: Aleksei Eskov (Russia)

5 September 2017	Italy	1–0	Israel	Mapei Stadium – Città del Tricolore, Reggio Emilia
20:45 UTC+2	Immobile 53'	Report		Attendance: 15,507; Referee: Benoît Bastien (France)

6 October 2017	Liechtenstein	0–1	Israel	Rheinpark Stadion, Vaduz
20:45 UTC+2		Report	Tibi 22'	Attendance: 3,498; Referee: Arnold Hunter (Northern Ireland)

9 October 2017	Israel	0–1	Spain	Teddy Stadium, Jerusalem
21:45 UTC+3		Report	Illarramendi 76'	Attendance: 28,700; Referee: Craig Thomson (Scotland)

Goalscorers

3 goals

- Tomer Hemed

2 goals

- Tal Ben Haim

1 goal

- Eliran Atar
- Dan Einbinder
- Lior Refaelov
- Eitan Tibi
- Eran Zahavi
2022 FIFA World Cup qualifier

At the 2022 FIFA World Cup, Israel competed in the UEFA Group F qualifying round, finishing in third place.

Standings

Pos	Team	Pld	W	D	L	GF	GA	GD	Pts	Qualification	Denmark	Scotland	Israel	Austria	Faroe Islands	Moldova
1	Denmark	10	9	0	1	30	3	+27	27	Qualification for 2022 FIFA World Cup	—	2–0	5–0	1–0	3–1	8–0
2	Scotland	10	7	2	1	17	7	+10	23	Advance to play-offs	2–0	—	3–2	2–2	4–0	1–0
3	Israel	10	5	1	4	23	21	+2	16		0–2	1–1	—	5–2	3–2	2–1
4	Austria	10	5	1	4	19	17	+2	16	Advance to play-offs via Nations League	0–4	0–1	4–2	—	3–1	4–1
5	Faroe Islands	10	1	1	8	7	23	−16	4		0–1	0–1	0–4	0–2	—	2–1
6	Moldova	10	0	1	9	5	30	−25	1		0–4	0–2	1–4	0–2	1–1	—

Source: FIFA, UEFA
Rules for classification: Tiebreakers
Winner qualified directly for the 2022 FIFA World Cup
Runner-up advanced to the play-offs

Matches

The match schedule was determined on 8 December 2020.

25 March 2021	Israel	0–2	Denmark	Bloomfield Stadium, Tel Aviv
UTC UTC+2		Report	Braithwaite 13'; Wind 67'	Attendance: 5,000; Referee: Craig Pawson (England)

28 March 2021	Israel	1–1	Scotland	Bloomfield Stadium, Tel Aviv
21:45 UTC+3	Peretz 44'	Report	Fraser 56'	Attendance: 5,000; Referee: Deniz Aytekin (Germany)

31 March 2021	Moldova	1–4	Israel	Zimbru Stadium, Chișinău
21:45 UTC+3	Carp 29'	Report	Zahavi 45+2'; Solomon 57'; Dabbur 64'; Natcho 66'	Attendance: 0 (Note: Due to the COVID-19 pandemic in Europe, the match was played behind closed doors.); Referee: Bojan Pandžić (Sweden)

1 September 2021	Faroe Islands	0–4	Israel	Tórsvøllur, Tórshavn
21:45 UTC+3		Report	Zahavi 12', 44', 90+2'; Dabbur 52'	Attendance: 2,666; Referee: Dennis Higler (Netherlands)

4 September 2021	Israel	5–2	Austria	Sammy Ofer Stadium, Haifa
21:45 UTC+3	Solomon 5'; Dabbur 20'; Zahavi 33', 90'; Weissman 59'	Report	Baumgartner 42'; Arnautović 55'	Attendance: 13,550; Referee: Felix Zwayer (Germany)

7 September 2021	Denmark	5–0	Israel	Parken Stadium, Copenhagen
21:45 UTC+3	Poulsen 28'; Kjær 31'; Skov Olsen 41'; Delaney 58'; Cornelius 90+1'	Report		Attendance: 35,158; Referee: Tobias Stieler (Germany)

9 October 2021	Scotland	3–2	Israel	Hampden Park, Glasgow
17:00 UTC+1	J. McGinn 30'; Dykes 57'; McTominay 90+4'	Report	Zahavi 5'; Dabbur 32'	Attendance: 50,585; Referee: Szymon Marciniak (Poland)

12 October 2021	Israel	2–1	Moldova	Turner Stadium, Beersheba
21:45 UTC+3	Zahavi 28'; Dabbur 49'	Report	Nicolaescu 90+4'	Attendance: 9,000; Referee: Andris Treimanis (Latvia)

12 November 2021	Austria	4–2	Israel	Wörthersee Stadion, Klagenfurt
21:45 UTC+2	Arnautović 51' (pen.); Schaub 62', 72'; Sabitzer 84'	Report	Bitton 33'; Peretz 59'	Attendance: 4,300; Referee: Ovidiu Hațegan (Romania)

15 November 2021	Israel	3–2	Faroe Islands	Netanya Stadium, Netanya
21:45 UTC+2	Dabbur 30' (pen.); Weissman 58'; Peretz 74'	Report	Vatnhamar 62'; K. Olsen 72'	Attendance: 6,800; Referee: Jérôme Brisard (France)

Goalscorers

8 goals

- Eran Zahavi

6 goals

- Mu'nas Dabbur

3 goals

- Dor Peretz

2 goals

- Manor Solomon
- Shon Weissman

1 goal

- Nir Bitton
- Bibars Natcho
2026 FIFA World Cup qualifier

At the 2026 FIFA World Cup, Israel competed in the UEFA Group I qualifying round, finishing in third place.

Standings

Pos	Team	Pld	W	D	L	GF	GA	GD	Pts	Qualification	(Norway national football team)	(Italy national football team)	(Israel national football team)	(Estonia national football team)	(Moldova national football team)
1	Norway	8	8	0	0	37	5	+32	24	Qualification for 2026 FIFA World Cup	—	3–0	5–0	4–1	11–1
2	Italy	8	6	0	2	21	12	+9	18	Advance to play-offs	1–4	—	3–0	5–0	2–0
3	Israel	8	4	0	4	19	20	−1	12		2–4	4–5	—	2–1	4–1
4	Estonia	8	1	1	6	8	21	−13	4		0–1	1–3	1–3	—	1–1
5	Moldova	8	0	1	7	5	32	−27	1		0–5	0–2	0–4	2–3	—

Source: FIFA, UEFA
Rules for classification: Tiebreakers
Winner qualified directly for the 2026 FIFA World Cup
Runner-up advanced to the play-offs

Matches

The match schedule was determined on 13 December 2024.

22 March 2025	Israel	2–1	Estonia	Nagyerdei Stadion, Debrecen
20:45 UTC+1	Hein 23' (o.g.); Dasa 75'	Report	Paskotši 10'	Attendance: 270; Referee: Nikola Dabanović (Montenegro)

25 March 2025	Israel	2–4	Norway	Nagyerdei Stadion, Debrecen
20:45 UTC+1	Abu Fani 55'; Turgeman 90+3'	Report	Møller Wolfe 39'; Sørloth 59'; Ajer 65'; Haaland 83'	Attendance: 1,200; Referee: Chris Kavanagh (England)

6 June 2025	Estonia	1–3	Israel	Lilleküla Stadium, Tallinn
21:45 UTC+3	Käit 31'	Report	Biton 39', 49'; Abu Fani 89' (pen.)	Attendance: 5,967; Referee: Willy Delajod (France)

5 September 2025	Moldova	0–4	Israel	Zimbru Stadium, Chișinău
21:45 UTC+3		Report	Do. Peretz 15'; Solomon 35'; Baribo 59'; Gloukh 77'	Attendance: 7,242; Referee: John Beaton (Scotland)

8 September 2025	Israel	4–5	Italy	Nagyerdei Stadion, Debrecen
20:45 UTC+2	Locatelli 16' (o.g.); Do. Peretz 52', 89'; Bastoni 87' (o.g.)	Report	Kean 40', 54'; Politano 58'; Raspadori 81'; Tonali 90+1'	Attendance: 2,540; Referee: Slavko Vinčić (Slovenia)

11 October 2025	Norway	5–0	Israel	Ullevaal Stadion, Oslo
18:00 UTC+2	Khalaily 18' (o.g.); Haaland 27', 63', 72'; Nachmias 28' (o.g.)	Report		Attendance: 19,363; Referee: Szymon Marciniak (Poland)

14 October 2025	Italy	3–0	Israel	Stadio Friuli, Udine
20:45 UTC+2	Retegui 45+2' (pen.), 74'; Mancini 90+3'	Report		Attendance: 9,965; Referee: Clément Turpin (France)

16 November 2025	Israel	4–1	Moldova	Zimbru Stadium, Chișinău
20:45 UTC+1	Turgeman 21' (pen.); Revivo 65'; E. Peretz 85'; Baboglo 88' (o.g.)	Report	Nicolaescu 37'	Attendance: 3,312; Referee: Allard Lindhout (Netherlands)

Goalscorers

3 goals

- Dor Peretz

2 goals

- Mohammad Abu Fani
- Dan Biton
- Dor Turgeman

1 goal

- Tai Baribo
- Eli Dasa
- Oscar Gloukh
- Eliel Peretz
- Roy Revivo
- Manor Solomon

1 own goal

- Anan Khalaily (against Norway)
- Idan Nachmias (against Norway)

== Record players ==
Ten players were fielded in all three of Israel's group matches in 1970 by coach Emmanuel Scheffer, making them record World Cup players for their country.

Rank	Player	Matches
1	Shraga Bar	3
1	Yehoshua Feigenbaum	3
1	David Primo	3
1	Zvi Rosen	3
1	Shmuel Rosenthal	3
1	Yisha'ayahu Schwager	3
1	Itzhak Shum	3
1	Giora Spiegel	3
1	Mordechai Spiegler	3
1	Itzhak Vissoker	3

== Goalscorers ==
Israel's sole international goal at a FIFA World Cup final-tournament was scored by team captain Mordechai Spiegler in their 1–1 draw against Sweden on 7 June 1970.

== See also ==
- Asian nations at the FIFA World Cup
- 1986 FIFA World Cup qualification (OFC)
- 1970 FIFA World Cup qualification (AFC and OFC)
- Israel at the Summer Olympics
- Israel at the Asian Games
- Israel at the AFC Asian Cup
