= 1970 FIFA World Cup Group 2 =

Football tournament group stage

Group 2 of the 1970 FIFA World Cup was contested in the Estadio Cuauhtémoc and Estadio Nemesio Díez between 2 and 11 June 1970. Italy won the group, and advanced to the quarter-finals, along with Uruguay, who finished second by virtue of goal difference. Sweden and Israel failed to advance.

== Standings ==
Pos	Team	Pld	W	D	L	GF	GA	GD	Pts	Qualification
1	Italy	3	1	2	0	1	0	+1	4	Advance to knockout stage
2	Uruguay	3	1	1	1	2	1	+1	3	Advance to knockout stage
3	Sweden	3	1	1	1	2	2	0	3	
4	Israel	3	0	2	1	1	3	−2	2	

Source: FIFA

== Matches ==
All times local (UTC−6)

=== Uruguay vs Israel ===
2 June 1970
16:00

Uruguay	2–0	Israel
Maneiro 23'; Mujica 50'

Estadio Cuauhtémoc, Puebla
Attendance: 20,654
Referee: Bobby Davidson (Scotland)

Uruguay	Israel

GK	1	Ladislao Mazurkiewicz
DF	4	Luis Ubiña
DF	2	Atilio Ancheta
DF	3	Roberto Matosas
DF	6	Juan Mujica
MF	7	Luis Cubilla
MF	5	Julio Montero Castillo
MF	10	Ildo Maneiro
MF	8	Pedro Rocha (c)	(substituted off) 12'
MF	21	Julio Losada
FW	9	Víctor Espárrago
Substitutions:
FW	20	Julio César Cortés	(substituted on) 12'
Manager:
Juan Hohberg

GK	1	Itzhak Vissoker
DF	12	Yisha'ayahu Schwager
DF	4	David Primo
DF	14	Danny Shmulevich-Rom	(substituted off) 57'
DF	5	Zvi Rosen
MF	6	Shmuel Rosenthal
MF	8	Giora Spiegel
MF	10	Mordechai Spiegler (c)
MF	7	Itzhak Shum
FW	9	Yehoshua Feigenbaum
FW	15	Rachamim Talbi	(substituted off) 46'
Substitutions:
DF	2	Shraga Bar	(substituted on) 46'
DF	16	Yochanan Vollach	(substituted on) 57'
Manager:
Emmanuel Scheffer

Assistant referees:
Rudolf Scheurer (Switzerland)
Seyoum Tarekegn (Ethiopia)

=== Italy vs Sweden ===
3 June 1970
16:00

Italy	1–0	Sweden
Domenghini 10'

Estadio Luis Dosal, Toluca
Attendance: 13,433
Referee: Jack Taylor (England)

Italy	Sweden

GK	1	Enrico Albertosi
DF	2	Tarcisio Burgnich
DF	5	Pierluigi Cera
DF	7	Comunardo Niccolai	(substituted off) 37'
DF	3	Giacinto Facchetti (c)
MF	10	Mario Bertini
MF	16	Giancarlo De Sisti
MF	15	Alessandro Mazzola
FW	13	Angelo Domenghini
FW	20	Roberto Boninsegna
FW	11	Gigi Riva
Substitutions:
DF	8	Roberto Rosato	(substituted on) 37'
Manager:
Ferruccio Valcareggi

GK	1	Ronnie Hellström
DF	13	Claes Cronqvist	(yellow card) 56'
DF	3	Kurt Axelsson
DF	4	Björn Nordqvist (c)
DF	5	Roland Grip
MF	6	Tommy Svensson
MF	7	Bo Larsson		(substituted off) 80'
MF	20	Jan Olsson
FW	8	Leif Eriksson		(substituted off) 68'
FW	9	Ove Kindvall
FW	10	Ove Grahn
Substitutions:
MF	19	Göran Nicklasson		(substituted on) 80'
FW	21	Inge Ejderstedt		(substituted on) 68'
Manager:
Orvar Bergmark

Assistant referees:
Rudolf Scheurer (Switzerland)
Ali Kandil (Egypt)

=== Uruguay vs Italy ===
6 June 1970
16:00

Uruguay	0–0	Italy

Estadio Cuauhtémoc, Puebla
Attendance: 29,968
Referee: Rudi Glöckner (East Germany)

Uruguay	Italy

GK	1	Ladislao Mazurkiewicz
DF	4	Luis Ubiña (c)
DF	2	Atilio Ancheta
DF	3	Roberto Matosas
DF	6	Juan Mujica
MF	7	Luis Cubilla
MF	5	Julio Montero Castillo
MF	10	Ildo Maneiro
MF	20	Julio César Cortés	(yellow card) 15'
MF	17	Rúben Bareño		(substituted off) 70'
FW	9	Víctor Espárrago
Substitutions:
FW	19	Oscar Zubía		(substituted on) 70'
Manager:
Juan Hohberg

GK	1	Enrico Albertosi
DF	2	Tarcisio Burgnich
DF	5	Pierluigi Cera
DF	8	Roberto Rosato
DF	3	Giacinto Facchetti (c)
MF	13	Angelo Domenghini	(substituted off) 46'
MF	10	Mario Bertini
MF	15	Alessandro Mazzola
MF	16	Giancarlo De Sisti
FW	20	Roberto Boninsegna
FW	11	Gigi Riva
Substitutions:
DF	21	Giuseppe Furino	(substituted on) 46'
Manager:
Ferruccio Valcareggi

Assistant referees:
Kurt Tschenscher (West Germany)
Josip-Drago Horvat (Yugoslavia)

=== Sweden vs Israel ===
7 June 1970
12:00

Sweden	1–1	Israel
Turesson 53'		Spiegler 56'

Estadio Luis Dosal, Toluca
Attendance: 9,624
Referee: Seyoum Tarekegn (Ethiopia)

Sweden	Israel

GK	12	Sven-Gunnar Larsson
DF	2	Hans Selander
DF	3	Kurt Axelsson
DF	20	Jan Olsson
DF	5	Roland Grip
MF	6	Tommy Svensson (c)
MF	7	Bo Larsson
MF	16	Thomas Nordahl
FW	18	Tom Turesson
FW	9	Ove Kindvall
FW	11	Örjan Persson	(yellow card) 72'	(substituted off) 75'
Substitutions:
FW	22	Sten Pålsson		(substituted on) 75'
Manager:
Orvar Bergmark

GK	1	Itzhak Vissoker
DF	2	Shraga Bar	(yellow card) 38'
DF	4	David Primo	(yellow card) 89'
DF	16	Yochanan Vollach		(substituted off) 51'
DF	5	Zvi Rosen
MF	12	Yisha'ayahu Schwager
MF	6	Shmuel Rosenthal
MF	7	Itzhak Shum
FW	10	Mordechai Spiegler (c)
FW	8	Giora Spiegel
FW	9	Yehoshua Feigenbaum
Substitutions:
MF	19	Roni Shuruk		(substituted on) 51'
Manager:
Emmanuel Scheffer

Assistant referees:
Andrei Rădulescu (Romania)
Josip-Drago Horvat (Yugoslavia)

=== Sweden vs Uruguay ===
10 June 1970
16:00

Sweden	1–0	Uruguay
Grahn 90'

Estadio Cuauhtémoc, Puebla
Attendance: 18,163
Referee: Henry Landauer (United States)

Sweden	Uruguay

GK	12	Sven-Gunnar Larsson
DF	2	Hans Selander
DF	3	Kurt Axelsson
DF	4	Björn Nordqvist (c)
DF	5	Roland Grip
MF	6	Tommy Svensson
MF	7	Bo Larsson
MF	19	Göran Nicklasson	(substituted off) 84'
FW	8	Leif Eriksson
FW	9	Ove Kindvall	(substituted off) 58'
FW	11	Örjan Persson
Substitutions:
FW	10	Ove Grahn	(substituted on) 84'
FW	18	Tom Turesson	(substituted on) 58'
Manager:
Orvar Bergmark

GK	1	Ladislao Mazurkiewicz
DF	4	Luis Ubiña (c)
DF	6	Juan Mujica
DF	5	Julio Montero Castillo
DF	2	Atilio Ancheta
MF	3	Roberto Matosas
MF	9	Víctor Espárrago	(substituted off) 61'
MF	10	Ildo Maneiro
MF	20	Julio César Cortés
FW	19	Oscar Zubía
FW	21	Julio Losada
Substitutions:
FW	15	Dagoberto Fontes	(substituted on) 61'
Manager:
Juan Hohberg

Assistant referees:
Jack Taylor (England)
Andrei Rădulescu (Romania)

=== Italy vs Israel ===
11 June 1970
16:00

Italy	0–0	Israel

Estadio Luis Dosal, Toluca
Attendance: 9,890
Referee: Ayrton Vieira de Moraes (Brazil)

Italy	Israel

GK	1	Enrico Albertosi
DF	2	Tarcisio Burgnich
DF	5	Pierluigi Cera
DF	8	Roberto Rosato
DF	3	Giacinto Facchetti (c)
MF	10	Mario Bertini
MF	16	Giancarlo De Sisti
MF	15	Alessandro Mazzola
FW	13	Angelo Domenghini		(substituted off) 46'
FW	20	Roberto Boninsegna	(yellow card) 90'
FW	11	Gigi Riva
Substitutions:
MF	14	Gianni Rivera		(substituted on) 46'
Manager:
Ferruccio Valcareggi

GK	1	Itzhak Vissoker
DF	2	Shraga Bar
DF	4	David Primo	(yellow card) 62'
DF	12	Yisha'ayahu Schwager
DF	6	Shmuel Rosenthal
MF	5	Zvi Rosen
MF	3	Menachem Bello	(yellow card) 67'
MF	7	Itzhak Shum
FW	10	Mordechai Spiegler (c)
FW	8	Giora Spiegel
FW	9	Yehoshua Feigenbaum		(substituted off) 46'
Substitutions:
FW	14	Dani Shmulevich-Rom		(substituted on) 46'
Manager:
Emmanuel Scheffer

Assistant referees:
Seyoum Tarekegn (Ethiopia)
Kurt Tschenscher (West Germany)

== See also ==
- Israel at the FIFA World Cup
- Italy at the FIFA World Cup
- Sweden at the FIFA World Cup
- Uruguay at the FIFA World Cup
