= Israel at the AFC Asian Cup =

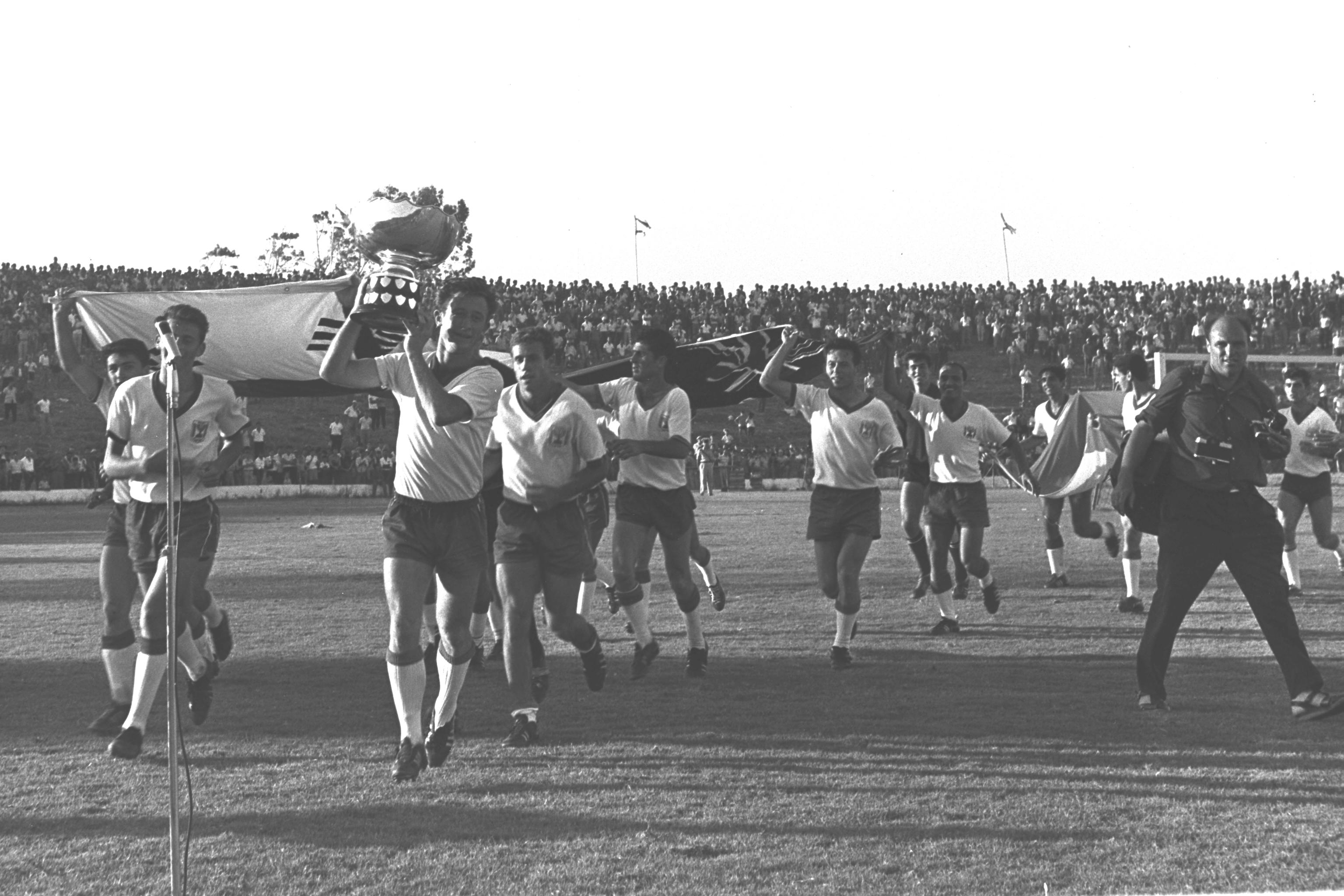
The Israel national team winning the 1964 AFC Asian Cup

Israel competed at the AFC Asian Cup four times. In 1956 and 1960 Israel finished second, in 1964 they finished first, and in 1968 they finished third. In 1972 Israel qualified for the tournament as hosts but later had to withdraw.

Israel was one of the founding members of the AFC (Asian Football Confederation) following its own independence in 1948 (prior to that it played under the banner of the "British Mandate of Palestine"). After the 1974 Asian Games in Iran, and Israel's 0–1 tense loss to Iran in the finals, Kuwait and other Muslim and Arab countries refused to play them. Following this, Israel were expelled from the confederation and spent a few years trying to qualify from such continental bodies as the OFC (Oceania), before eventually joining UEFA (Europe) officially.

== Record ==
AFC Asian Cup record
Year	Round	Position	GP	W	D*	L	GS	GA
(Hong Kong) 1956	Runners-up	2nd	3	2	0	1	6	5
(South Korea) 1960	Runners-up	2nd	3	2	0	1	6	4
(Israel) 1964	Champions	1st	3	3	0	0	5	1
(Iran) 1968	Third Place	3rd	4	2	0	2	11	5
(Thailand) 1972	Withdrew							
Total	Champions	4/15	13	9	0	4	28	15

Red border color indicates tournament was held on home soil.

== 1956 AFC Asian Cup ==
Israel competed at the 1956 AFC Asian Cup. This was the first AFC Asian Cup and Israel’s first appearance.

Team	Pld	W	D	L	GF	GA	GD	Pts
South Korea	3	2	1	0	9	6	+3	5
Israel	3	2	0	1	6	5	+1	4
Hong Kong	3	0	2	1	6	7	−1	2
South Vietnam	3	0	1	2	6	9	−3	1

Matches
1 September 1956
19:00

Hong Kong	2 – 3	Israel
Au Chi Yin 12', 66'		Glazer 37', 76'; Stelmach 69'

Government Stadium, Hong Kong
Attendance: 30,000
Referee: H.A. Sheppard (England)

8 September 1956
19:00

Israel	1 – 2	South Korea
Stelmach 71'		Woo Sang-kwon 52'; Sung Nak-woon 64'

Government Stadium, Hong Kong
Attendance: 20,000
Referee: Trương Văn Ky (South Vietnam)

12 September 1956
19:00

Israel	2 – 1	South Vietnam
Stelmach 14', 27'		Trần Văn Tổng 58'

Government Stadium, Hong Kong
Attendance: 15,000
Referee: Tommy Tucker (England)
Goalscorers

With four goals, Nahum Stelmach is the top scorer in the tournament.

4 goals

- Nahum Stelmach

2 goals

- Yehoshua Glazer
Squad

Head coach: (England) Jackie Gibbons

No.	Pos.	Player	Date of birth (age)	Caps	Goals	Club
	GK	Ya'akov Hodorov	16 June 1927 (aged 29)	12	0	(Israel Football Association) Hapoel Tel Aviv
	GK	Ya'akov Vissoker	5 September 1930 (aged 25)	0	0	(Israel Football Association) Hapoel Petah Tikva
	DF	David Kremer	6 April 1929 (aged 27)	2	0	(Israel Football Association) Hapoel Petah Tikva
	DF	Shaul Matania	8 March 1937 (aged 19)	2	0	(Israel Football Association) Maccabi Tel Aviv
	MF	Jerry Haldi	14 August 1935 (aged 21)	2	0	(Israel Football Association) Hapoel Petah Tikva
	MF	Binyamin Rabinovich	1936 (aged 20)	2	0	(Israel Football Association) Maccabi Tel Aviv
	MF	Itzhak Schneor	11 December 1925 (aged 30)	11	0	(Israel Football Association) Maccabi Tel Aviv
	MF	Asher Balut	6 January 1932 (aged 24)	5	0	(Israel Football Association) Hapoel Tel Aviv
	MF	Zigi Silberstein		0	0	(Israel Football Association) Maccabi Petah Tikva
	FW	Yehoshua Glazer	29 December 1927 (aged 28)	11	8	(Israel Football Association) Maccabi Tel Aviv
	FW	Yosef Mirmovich	24 July 1924 (aged 32)	11	0	(Israel Football Association) Maccabi Tel Aviv
	FW	Nahum Stelmach	19 July 1936 (aged 20)	2	1	(Israel Football Association) Hapoel Petah Tikva
	FW	Boaz Kofman	29 March 1935 (aged 21)	1	0	(Israel Football Association) Hapoel Petah Tikva
	FW	Rehavia Rozenboim	29 April 1934 (aged 22)	5	0	(Israel Football Association) Hapoel Tel Aviv
	FW	Shmuel Israeli	15 October 1928 (aged 27)	2	0	(Israel Football Association) Maccabi Tel Aviv
	FW	Eliezer Spiegel	20 June 1922 (aged 34)	2	0	(Israel Football Association) Maccabi Petah Tikva

== 1960 AFC Asian Cup ==
Israel competed at the 1960 AFC Asian Cup. This was the second AFC Asian Cup and Israel’s second appearance.

=== Qualification – Western Zone ===
Team	Pld	W	D	L	GF	GA	GD	Pts
Israel	6	3	2	1	10	8	+2	8
Iran	6	3	1	2	12	10	+2	7
Pakistan	6	2	1	3	8	10	–2	5
India	6	2	0	4	7	9	–2	4

Matches
5 December 1959

Israel	0 – 3	Iran
		Hajari 49'; Barmaki 59'; Dehdari 65'

Maharaja College Stadium, Kochi
Attendance: 30,000
Referee: P. Chakravarthy (India)

8 December 1959

India	1 – 3	Israel
Devadas 60'		R. Levi 35', 43', 53'

Maharaja College Stadium, Kochi
Attendance: 30,000

10 December 1959

Israel	2 – 0	Pakistan
R. Levi 55'; Stelmach 65'

Maharaja College Stadium, Kochi
Attendance: 15,000
Referee: P. Chakravarthy (India)

12 December 1959

Israel	1 – 1	Iran
Menchel 9'		Hajari 49'

Maharaja College Stadium, Kochi
Attendance: 15,000
Referee: P. Chakravarthy (India)

16 December 1959

India	1 – 2	Israel
Rehmatullah 19'		Stelmach 11'; R. Levi 75'

Maharaja College Stadium, Kochi
Attendance: 35,000
Referee: Natarajan (Malaya)

17 December 1959

Pakistan	2 – 2	Israel
Omar 49'; Ghafoor 57'		Menchel 60'; Ratzabi 68'

Maharaja College Stadium, Kochi
Attendance: 15,000
Referee: A. N. Jayaraman (India)

=== Tournament results ===
Team	Pld	W	D	L	GF	GA	GD	Pts
South Korea	3	3	0	0	9	1	+8	6
Israel	3	2	0	1	6	4	+2	4
Taiwan	3	1	0	2	2	2	0	2
South Vietnam	3	0	0	3	2	12	−10	0

Matches
17 October 1960
15:00

South Korea	3 – 0	Israel
Cho Yoon-Ok 17', 60'; Woo Sang-Kwon 30'

Hyochang Stadium, Seoul
Attendance: 30,000
Referee: Yozo Yokoyama (Japan)

19 October 1960

South Vietnam	1 – 5	Israel
Trần Văn Nhung 68' (pen.)		R. Levi 13'; Stelmach 18'; S. Levi 25'; Menchel 32'; Aharonskind 70'

Hyochang Stadium, Seoul
Attendance: 15,000

23 October 1960

Israel	1 – 0	Taiwan
S. Levi 72'

Hyochang Stadium, Seoul
Attendance: 25,000
Referee: Yozo Yokoyama (Japan)

=== Goal scorers ===
2 goals

- Shlomo Levi

1 goal

- Amnon Aharonskind
- Rafi Levi
- Avraham Menchel
- Nahum Stelmach

=== Squad ===
Squad

Head coach: (Hungary) Gyula Mándi

No.	Pos.	Player	Date of birth (age)	Caps	Goals	Club
	GK	Ya'akov Hodorov	16 June 1927 (aged 33)	23	0	(Israel Football Association) Hapoel Tel Aviv
	GK	Ya'akov Vissoker	5 September 1930 (aged 30)	2	0	(Israel Football Association) Hapoel Petah Tikva
	DF	Amatzia Levkovich	27 December 1937 (aged 22)	14	0	(Israel Football Association) Hapoel Tel Aviv
	DF	Dov Atzmon		0	0	(Israel Football Association) Hapoel Jerusalem
	DF	Mordechai Benbenishti	1 March 1938 (aged 22)	3	0	(Israel Football Association) Hapoel Jerusalem
	DF	Zvi Moisescu	13 August 1939 (aged 21)	3	0	(Israel Football Association) Maccabi Netanya
	MF	Avraham Klemi		0	0	(Israel Football Association) Maccabi Jaffa
	MF	Avraham Menchel	12 December 1935 (aged 24)	13	4	(Israel Football Association) Maccabi Haifa
	MF	Gideon Tish	13 October 1939 (aged 21)	16	0	(Israel Football Association) Hapoel Tel Aviv
	MF	Yosef Goldstein	29 March 1932 (aged 28)	20	1	(Israel Football Association) Maccabi Tel Aviv
	FW	Aharon Amar	1937 (aged 23)	8	0	(Israel Football Association) Maccabi Haifa
	FW	Amnon Aronskind		0	0	(Israel Football Association) Maccabi Tel Aviv
	FW	Nahum Stelmach	19 July 1936 (aged 24)	23	13	(Israel Football Association) Hapoel Petah Tikva
	FW	Rafi Levi	22 February 1938 (aged 22)	14	10	(Israel Football Association) Maccabi Tel Aviv
	FW	Shlomo Levi	1 June 1934 (aged 26)	0	0	(Israel Football Association) Hapoel Haifa
	FW	Shlomo Nahari	17 October 1934 (aged 25)	8	1	(Israel Football Association) Hapoel Petah Tikva
	FW	Yehoshua Glazer	29 December 1927 (aged 32)	32	15	(Israel Football Association) Maccabi Tel Aviv

== 1964 AFC Asian Cup ==
Israel competed at the 1964 AFC Asian Cup. This was the third AFC Asian Cup and Israel’s third appearance.

=== Host nation ===
The tournament used a round-robin system with the winners from the West, Central 1 and 2 and East Asia zones and the team from the host nation (Israel) competing for the title. 11 of the 16 nations withdrew including Iran and Japan with the result that only one zone (combined Central 1 and 2) played any qualifying matches and the 'winners' of 2 zones and host Israel qualified uncontested. In this diminished competition Israel won the title with three wins.

=== Venues ===
Ramat Gan	Haifa	Israel at the AFC Asian Cup is located in Israel	Tel Aviv	Jerusalem
Ramat Gan Stadium	Kiryat Eliezer Stadium	Israel at the AFC Asian Cup is located in Israel	Bloomfield Stadium	Hebrew University Stadium
Capacity: 41,583	Capacity: 17,000	Israel at the AFC Asian Cup is located in Israel	Capacity: 22,000	Capacity: 16,000

=== Qualification ===
Israel as the host nation automatically qualified for the tournament.

=== Tournament results ===
Team	Pld	W	D	L	GF	GA	GD	Pts
Israel	3	3	0	0	5	1	+4	6
India	3	2	0	1	5	3	+2	4
South Korea	3	1	0	2	2	4	−2	2
Hong Kong	3	0	0	3	1	5	−4	0

Matches
26 May 1964
16:30

Israel	1 – 0	Hong Kong
Spiegler 76'

Ramat Gan Stadium, Ramat Gan
Attendance: 25,000
Referee: Patrick Nice (Malaysia)

29 May 1964
16:00

Israel	2 – 0	India
Spiegler 29' (pen.); Aharoni 76'

Bloomfield Stadium, Tel Aviv
Attendance: 20,000
Referee: Li Pak Tung (Malaysia)

3 June 1964
16:00

South Korea	1 – 2	Israel
Lee Soon-Myung 79'		Leon 20'; Tish 38'

Ramat Gan Stadium, Ramat Gan
Attendance: 35,000
Referee: Davoud Nassiri (Iran)

=== Goal scorers ===
2 goals

- Mordechai Spiegler

1 goal

- Yohai Aharoni
- Moshe Leon
- Gideon Tish

=== Squad ===
Squad

Head coach: (Israel) Yosef Merimovich

No.	Pos.	Player	Date of birth (age)	Caps	Goals	Club
	GK	Haim Levin	3 March 1937 (aged 27)	1	0	(Israel Football Association) Maccabi Tel Aviv
	GK	Itzhak Vissoker	18 September 1944 (aged 19)	4	0	(Israel Football Association) Hapoel Petah Tikva
	DF	Avraham Kalmi		1	0	(Israel Football Association) Maccabi Jaffa
	DF	David Primo	5 May 1946 (aged 18)	2	0	(Israel Football Association) Hapoel Tel Aviv
	DF	Haim Bahar	10 April 1943 (aged 21)	0	0	(Israel Football Association) Hapoel Petah Tikva
	DF	Moshe Leon	9 January 1944 (aged 20)	7	0	(Israel Football Association) Maccabi Jaffa
	DF	Shaul Matania	8 March 1937 (aged 19)	17	0	(Israel Football Association) Maccabi Tel Aviv
	MF	Amatzia Levkovich	27 December 1937 (aged 18)	36	1	(Israel Football Association) Hapoel Tel Aviv
	MF	Gideon Tish	13 October 1939 (aged 16)	34	0	(Israel Football Association) Hapoel Tel Aviv
	MF	Mordechai Spiegler	19 August 1944 (aged 19)	4	1	(Israel Football Association) Maccabi Netanya
	MF	Nahum Stelmach	19 July 1936 (aged 27)	45	20	(Israel Football Association) Hapoel Petah Tikva
	MF	Yehezkel Katsav	1945 (aged 19)	0	0	(Israel Football Association) Maccabi Jaffa
	MF	Yosef Mahalal	25 December 1939 (aged 24)	4	2	(Israel Football Association) Bnei Yehuda
	FW	Einstein Kalish	1939 (aged 25)	2	0	(Israel Football Association) Maccabi Jaffa
	FW	Rahamim Talbi	17 May 1943 (aged 21)	0	0	(Israel Football Association) Maccabi Tel Aviv
	FW	Roby Young	15 May 1942 (aged 22)	13	2	(Israel Football Association) Hapoel Haifa
	FW	Shlomo Levi	1 June 1934 (aged 29)	11	6	(Israel Football Association) Hapoel Ramat Gan
	FW	Yohai Aharoni	8 June 1943 (aged 20)	0	0	(Israel Football Association) Hapoel Mahane Yehuda

== 1968 AFC Asian Cup ==
Israel competed at the 1968 AFC Asian Cup. This was the fourth AFC Asian Cup and Israel’s fourth and last appearance.

After the 1968 tournament Israel did not compete in a regional football tournament for many years. Israel was expelled from the AFC in the early 1970s and eventually became a member of UEFA. After joining the UEFA Israel began competing in the UEFA European Championship in 1996.

=== Qualification – West Zone 1 ===
Israel qualified for the tournament by default after all other teams in their zone withdrew from the tournament.

=== Tournament results ===
Team	Pld	W	D	L	GF	GA	GD	Pts
Iran	4	4	0	0	11	2	+9	8
Burma	4	2	1	1	5	4	+1	5
Israel	4	2	0	2	11	5	+6	4
Taiwan	4	0	2	2	3	10	−7	2
Hong Kong	4	0	1	3	2	11	−9	1

Matches
12 May 1968

Hong Kong	1–6	Israel
Yuan Kuan Yick 76'		Spiegler 9', 53'; Spiegel 52', 65'; Romano 61', 71'

Amjadieh Stadium, Tehran
Attendance: 30,000
Referee: Batha Chaterchi (India)

14 May 1968

Burma	1–0	Israel
Suk Bahadur 42'

Amjadieh Stadium, Tehran
Attendance: 30,000
Referee: Norman Boswell (Malaysia)

17 May 1968

Israel	4–1	Taiwan
Romano 2', 60'; Rosenthal 70'; Spiegel 76'		Li Huan-wen 45+1'

Amjadieh Stadium, Tehran
Attendance: 20,000
Referee: Narayan Ghosh (India)

19 May 1968

Iran	2–1	Israel
Behzadi 75'; Ghelichkhani 86'		Spiegel 56'

Amjadieh Stadium, Tehran
Attendance: 30,000
Referee: Alex Joseph Vaz (India)

=== Goal scorers ===
With 4 goals, Giora Spiegel and Moshe Romano of Israel tied with Homayoun Behzadi of Iran as the top scorers of the tournament.

4 goals

- Giora Spiegel
- Moshe Romano

2 goals

- Mordechai Spiegler

1 goal

- Shmuel Rosenthal

=== Squad ===
Squad

Head coach: (Socialist Federal Republic of Yugoslavia) Milovan Ćirić

No.	Pos.	Player	Date of birth (age)	Caps	Goals	Club
	GK	Itzhak Vissoker	18 September 1944 (aged 23)	14	0	(Israel Football Association) Hapoel Petah Tikva
	GK	Haim Levin	3 March 1937 (aged 27)	15	0	(Israel Football Association) Maccabi Tel Aviv
	DF	Menahem Bello	26 December 1947 (aged 20)	14	0	(Israel Football Association) Maccabi Tel Aviv
	DF	Dani Shmulevich	29 November 1940 (aged 27)	23	0	(Israel Football Association) Maccabi Haifa
	DF	Itzhak Marili	12 May 1945 (aged 22)	2	0	(Israel Football Association) Hapoel Jerusalem
	DF	David Karako	11 February 1944 (aged 24)	3	0	(Israel Football Association) Maccabi Tel Aviv
	DF	Itzhak Drucker	3 June 1947 (aged 20)	6	0	(Israel Football Association) Hapoel Petah Tikva
	DF	Zvi Rosen	23 June 1947 (aged 20)	2	0	(Israel Football Association) Maccabi Tel Aviv
	MF	Dani Borsuk	16 February 1944 (aged 24)	6	0	(Israel Football Association) Hapoel Tel Aviv
	MF	Haim Nurieli	1 May 1943 (aged 25)	2	0	(Israel Football Association) Hapoel Tel Aviv
	MF	Moshe Asis	9 October 1943 (aged 24)	13	1	(Israel Football Association) Maccabi Tel Aviv
	MF	Shmuel Rosenthal	22 April 1947 (aged 21)	14	1	(Israel Football Association) Hapoel Petah Tikva
	FW	George Borba	12 July 1944 (aged 23)	9	4	(Israel Football Association) Hapoel Tel Aviv
	FW	Giora Spiegel	27 July 1947 (aged 20)	10	5	(Israel Football Association) Maccabi Tel Aviv
	FW	Mordechai Spiegler	19 August 1944 (aged 23)	27	13	(Israel Football Association) Maccabi Netanya
	FW	Moshe Romano	6 May 1946 (aged 22)	5	1	(Israel Football Association) Shimshon Tel Aviv
	FW	Rahamim Talbi	17 May 1943 (aged 24)	18	5	(Israel Football Association) Maccabi Tel Aviv
	FW	Roby Young	15 May 1942 (aged 25)	37	5	(Israel Football Association) Hapoel Haifa

== See also ==
- AFC Asian Cup qualifiers#All-time table
- Israel at the Asian Games
- Israel at the FIFA World Cup
