= Zvi Tendler =

Israeli footballer

Zvi Tendler צבי טנדלר
Personal information
- Date of birth: 2 November 1937 (age 88)

International career
Years	Team	Apps	(Gls)
1961	Israel	5	(0)

Zvi Tendler (Hebrew: צבי טנדלר; born 2 November 1937) is an Israeli footballer. He played in five matches for the Israel national football team in 1961.
