= Yaacov Visoker =

Israeli footballer (1930–2017)

Yaacov Visoker יעקב ויסוקר
Personal information
- Date of birth: 5 September 1930
- Date of death: 25 December 2017 (aged 87)
- Position: Goalkeeper

International career
Years	Team	Apps	(Gls)
1956–1961	Israel	9	(0)

Yaacov Visoker (Hebrew: יעקב ויסוקר; 5 September 1930 – 25 December 2017) was an Israeli footballer who played as a goalkeeper. He made nine appearances for the Israel national team from 1956 to 1961. Visoker died on 25 December 2017, at the age of 87.
