= Yair Nossovsky =

Israeli footballer

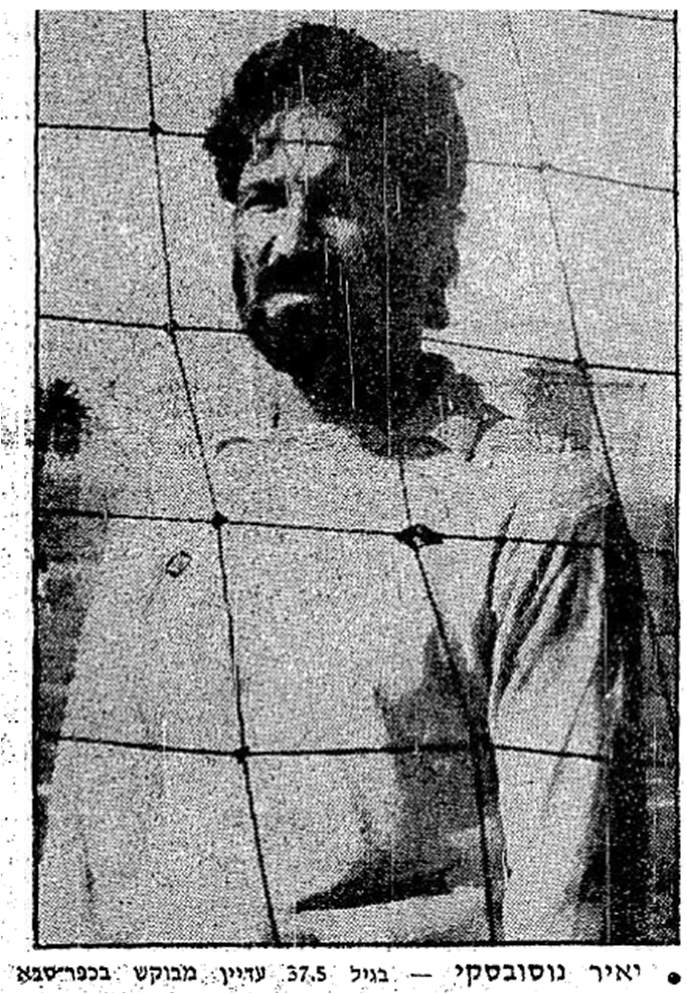

Personal information
- Date of birth: 29 June 1937 (age 89)
- Position: Goalkeeper

Senior career*
Years	Team	Apps	(Gls)
- Hapoel Kfar Saba

International career
1965–1970	Israel	2	(0)
- * Club domestic league appearances and goals

Yair Nossovsky (Hebrew: יאיר נוסובסקי; born 29 June 1937) is an Israeli former international footballer who competed at the 1970 FIFA World Cup, having previously played for the Israel national team during the 1966 World Cup qualifying campaign.

Nossovsky played in two official games for the Israel national side.
