= Emmanuel Scheffer =

Israeli footballer (1923–2012)

Emmanuel Scheffer עמנואל שפר
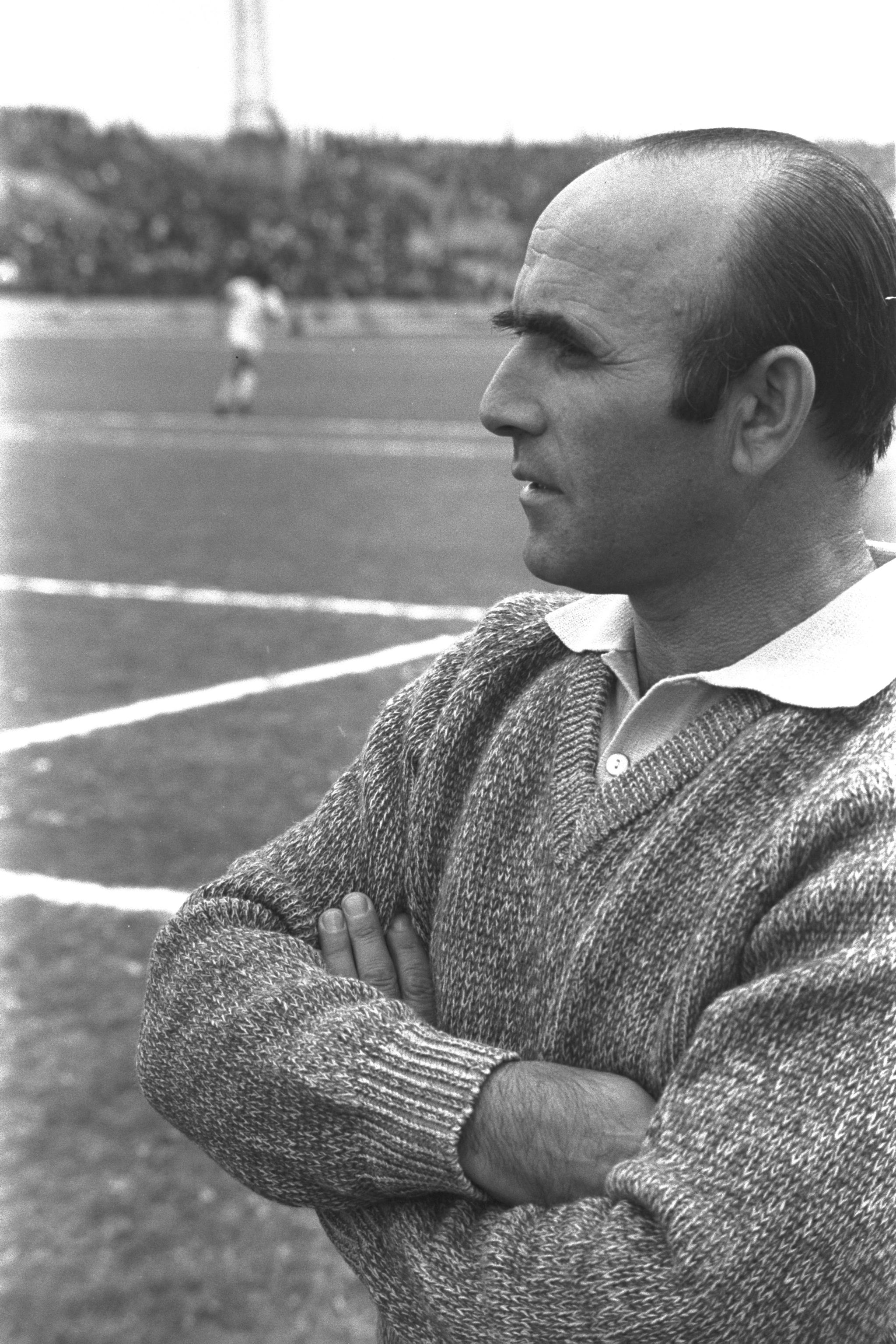

Personal information
- Date of birth: 11 February 1923
- Place of birth: Berlin, Weimar Republic
- Date of death: 28 December 2012 (aged 89)
- Place of death: Ramat Hasharon, Israel
- Position: Defender

Senior career*
Years	Team	Apps	(Gls)
1947–1950	Pionier Wrocław		
1950–1951	Hapoel Haifa		
1951–1954	Hapoel Kfar Saba		(9)

International career
	Israel B	1	(0)

Managerial career
- 1957–1960: Hapoel Kfar Saba
- 1960–1961: Hapoel Marmorek Rehovot
- 1961–1962: Hapoel Ra'anana
- 1962–1963: Bnei Yehuda
- 1963–1967: Israel U19
- 1967: Maccabi Netanya
- 1968–1970: Israel
- 1978–1979: Israel
- 1979–1980: Beitar Jerusalem
- * Club domestic league appearances and goals

Emmanuel Scheffer (Hebrew: עמנואל שפר; 11 February 1923 – 28 December 2012) was an Israeli football player and coach who was born in Germany.

He was twice the manager of the Israel national team (1968–70, 1978–79), and led the team at the 1968 Summer Olympics, and led the team to their only appearance in the World Cup, in 1970.

Scheffer died on 28 December 2012. He was 88.

== Honours ==
=== As a player ===
- Israeli Second Division: 1951–52

=== As a manager ===
- AFC U-19 Championship: 1964, 1965, 1966, 1967
