= Yisha'ayahu Schwager =

Israeli footballer

Yisha'ayahu Schwager ישעיהו שווגר

Personal information
- Full name: Jeszaja Szwagier
- Date of birth: February 10, 1946
- Place of birth: Poland
- Date of death: August 31, 2000 (aged 54)
- Place of death: Israel
- Height: 1.74 m (5 ft 9 in)
- Position: Defender

Youth career
- Hapoel Haifa
- Maccabi Haifa

Senior career*
Years	Team	Apps	(Gls)
1962–1976	Maccabi Haifa	360	(11)

International career
1966–1974	Israel	37	(0)
- * Club domestic league appearances and goals

Yisha'ayahu Schwager (Hebrew: ישעיהו שווגר, Polish: Jeszaja Szwagier; 10 February 1946 - 31 August 2000) was an Israeli footballer.

== 1970 World Cup ==
Schwager was a member of the Israel squad that participated in the World Cup finals in Mexico. During a group play match against Italy, Schwager was given the task of marking Luigi Riva, which he did so well that he received praise from the media back home. In 2000, Schwager died from a heart attack.

Schwager also played at the 1968 Summer Olympics.
