= Roni Shuruk =

Israeli footballer

Roni Shuruk רוני שורוק

Personal information
- Full name: Aharon Shuruk
- Date of birth: February 24, 1946 (age 80)
- Place of birth: Mandate Palestine
- Height: 1.83 m (6 ft 0 in)
- Position: Midfielder

Senior career*
Years	Team	Apps	(Gls)
1966–1974	Hakoah Ramat Gan		
1975–1976	Maccabi Haifa	5	(0)
1976–1977	Hapoel Kfar Saba		

International career
1969–1970	Israel	9	(0)
- * Club domestic league appearances and goals

Aharon 'Roni' Shuruk (Hebrew: רוני שורוק; born February 24, 1946) is a former Israeli football midfielder, who played for the Israel national team between 1969 and 1970. He was part of the Israel squad for the 1970 World Cup.

At club level, Shuruk played for Hakoah Ramat Gan, Maccabi Haifa and Hapoel Kfar Saba.
