= Shraga Bar =

Israeli footballer (1948–2025)

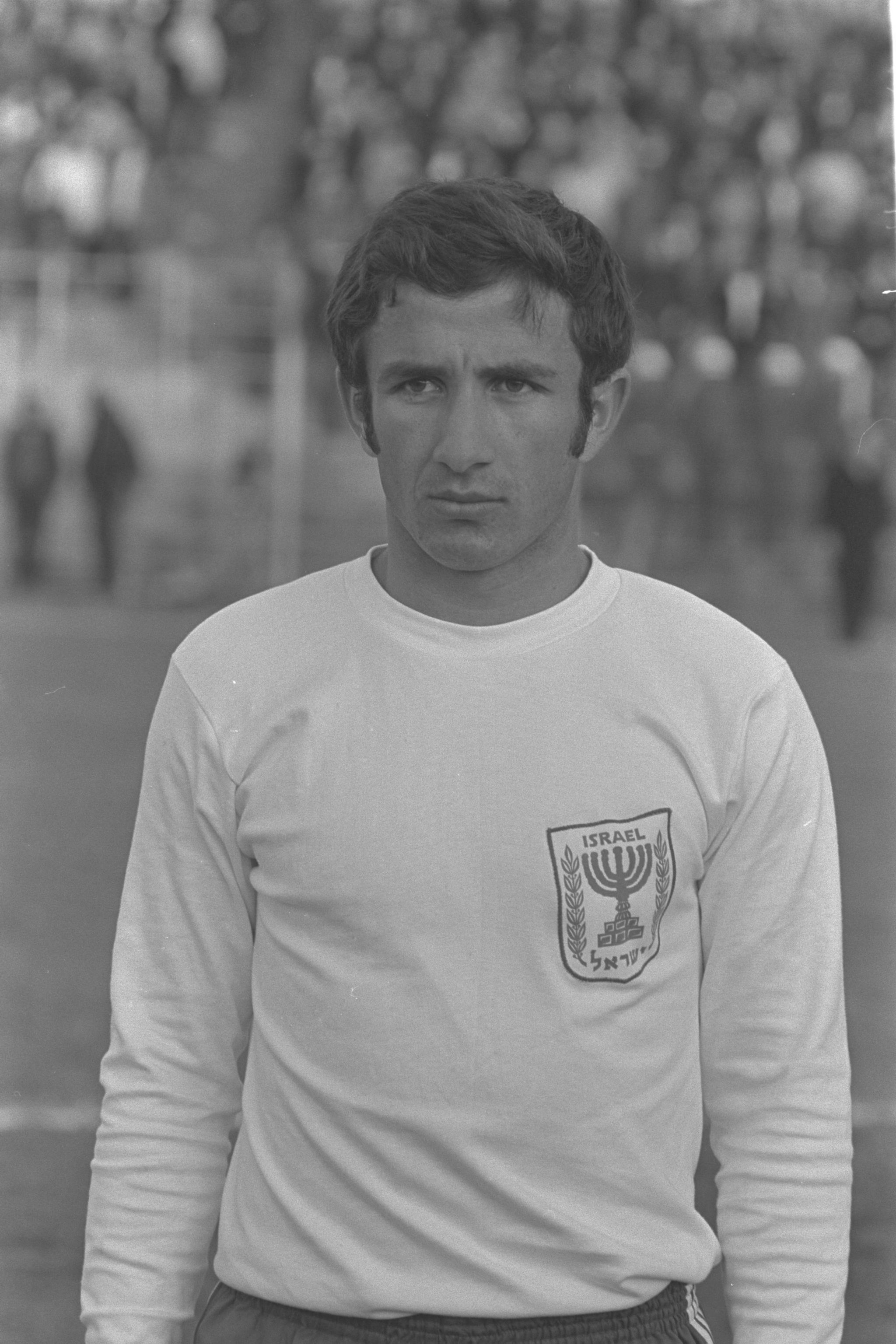
- Bar in 1970

Personal information
- Date of birth: 24 March 1948
- Place of birth: Hofgeismar, Hesse, Germany
- Date of death: 27 October 2025 (aged 77)
- Place of death: Ramat Gan, Israel
- Height: 1.70 m (5 ft 7 in)
- Position: Defender

Senior career*
Years	Team	Apps	(Gls)
1964–1978	Maccabi Netanya	375	(?)
1978–1979	Hapoel Ramat Gan		

International career
1968–1972	Israel	34	(1)
- * Club domestic league appearances and goals

Shraga Bar (Hebrew: שרגא בר; 24 March 1948 – 27 October 2025) was an Israeli footballer who played as a defender. He made 34 appearances scoring one goal for the Israel national team between 1968 and 1972. He was part of the team for the Israel squad in the 1970 World Cup. At club level, Bar played for Maccabi Netanya and Hapoel Ramat Gan. Bar died on 27 October 2025, at the age of 77.
