= Shmuel Rosenthal =

Israeli footballer (born 1947)

Shmuel Rosenthal שמואל רוזנטל
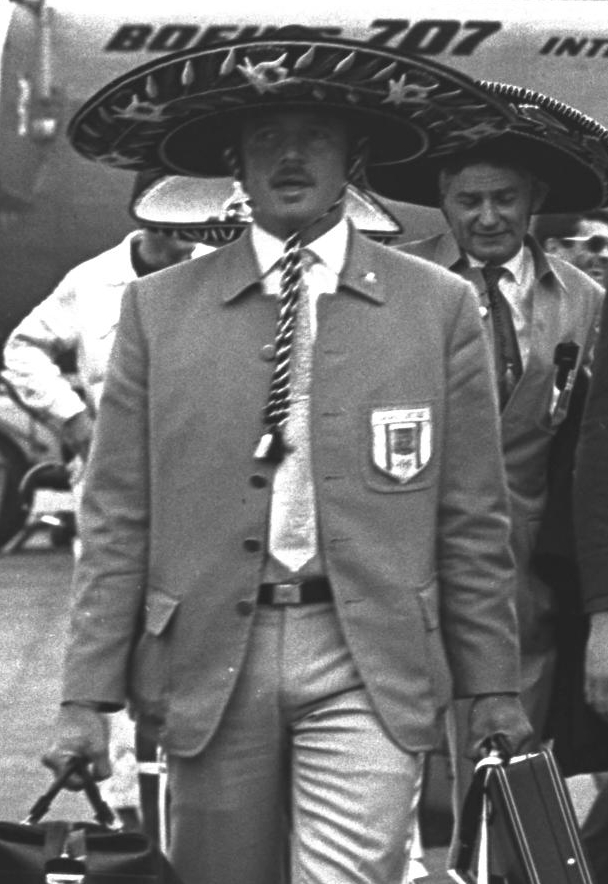
- Shmuel Rosenthal in 1968

Personal information
- Date of birth: 22 April 1947 (age 79)
- Place of birth: Petah Tikva, Israel
- Position: Midfielder

Senior career*
Years	Team	Apps	(Gls)
1965–1972	Hapoel Petah Tikva	201	(7)
1972–1973	Borussia Mönchengladbach	13	(1)
1973–1976	Hapoel Petah Tikva	90	(4)
1976–1978	Beitar Tel Aviv		
1978	Oakland Stompers	18	(0)
1979	Beitar Tel Aviv		
1980–1983	Hapoel Lod		

International career
1965–1973	Israel	34	(2)

Managerial career
- 1981–1983: Hapoel Lod (player-manager)
- 1983–1984: Hapoel Lod
- * Club domestic league appearances and goals

Shmuel Rosenthal (Hebrew: שמואל רוזנטל, also known as Sam Rosenthal, born 22 April 1947) is an Israeli former international footballer. With Israel he participated in the Olympic Games of 1968 and the World Cup 1970. When he moved from Hapoel Petah Tikva to the German club Borussia Mönchengladbach in 1972 he became the first Israeli professional hired by a European club.

== Career ==
Rosenthal commenced his career 1965 with the Israeli first division side Hapoel Petah Tikva. Already in the same year he debuted with the Israel national football team. With Israel he took part in the 1968 Summer Olympics in Mexico. In Mexico the team reached the quarterfinals, where the side held Bulgaria to a 1–1 draw after extra time. The match was eventually decided for Bulgaria by drawing of a lot, as penalty shootouts had not yet been introduced.

With Israel he also qualified for the 1970 World Cup in Mexico via a walkover against North Korea, which refused to play in Israel and the Oceanian teams of New Zealand and Australia. There Rosenthal participated in all three matches of his team. Israel initially lost to Uruguay, but managed to hold Sweden and the later finalist Italy to draws.

Altogether Rosenthal played 30 times for his country, scoring once. Including matches in the context of Olympic tournaments and the like his tally here rises to 43 matches and two goals. A contemporary of his in the Israeli sides of this era was Mordechai Spiegler, who is considered one of the greatest players of all times of his country.

In 1972, Rosenthal joined the then reigning German champions Borussia Mönchengladbach, becoming the first professional Israeli player finding an engagement in Europe. In the first half of the season he played for the club in 13 Bundesliga matches, scoring one goal, and a number of UEFA Cup matches. By the end of the season the club ended the league as fifth, but won the DFB-Pokal and reached the finals of the UEFA Cup. With Mönchengladbach, Rosenthal played mainly libero, a position he filled "often somewhat too careless", according to the chronicles of the club.

In 1973, he returned to Hapoel Petah Tikva. In 1976, he switched to Beitar Tel Aviv, before moving in 1978 to the Oakland Stompers in the then fashionable North American Soccer League, which in that era featured some well known stars from Europe and South America.

In 1979, he returned to Israel as he returned to play for Beitar Tel Aviv. Later on he moved to Hapoel Lod there he finished his career in 1983 and became the club's manager for a short period of time.
