= Itzhak Vissoker =

Israeli footballer

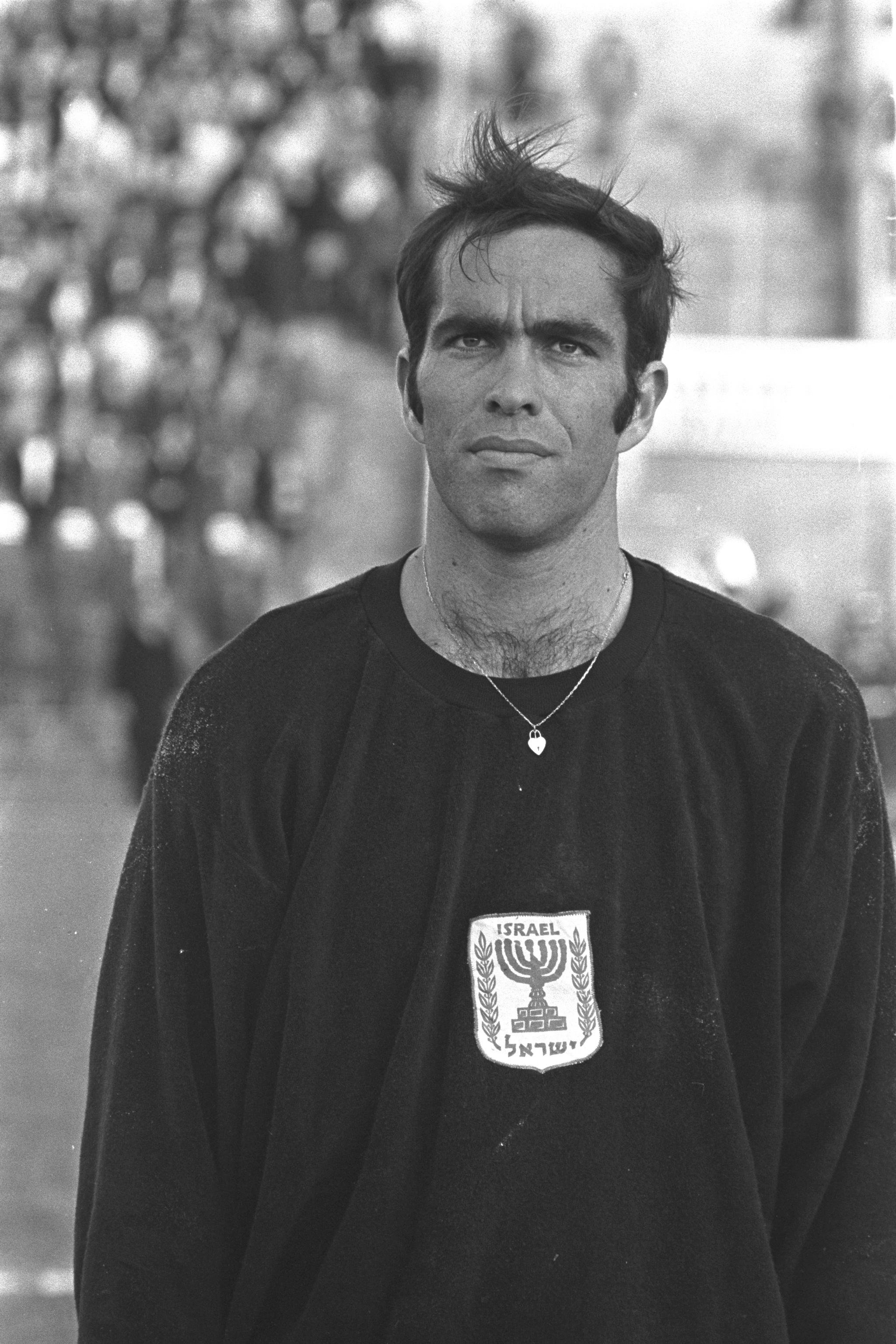
- Vissoker in 1970

Personal information
- Date of birth: 18 September 1944 (age 82)
- Height: 1.80 m (5 ft 11 in)
- Position: Goalkeeper

Senior career*
Years	Team	Apps	(Gls)
1963–1977	Hapoel Petah Tikva	327	(0)
1977–1980	Maccabi Netanya		

International career
1964–1976	Israel	43	(0)
- * Club domestic league appearances and goals

Itzhak Vissoker (Hebrew: יצחק ויסוקר; born 18 September 1944) is an Israeli former international footballer who competed at the 1970 FIFA World Cup, as well as at the 1976 Summer Olympics.

Vissoker played in 40 official games for the Israeli national side. He also played club football for Hapoel Petah Tikva and Maccabi Netanya.
