= David Primo =

Bulgarian-Israeli footballer

David Primo דוד פרימו
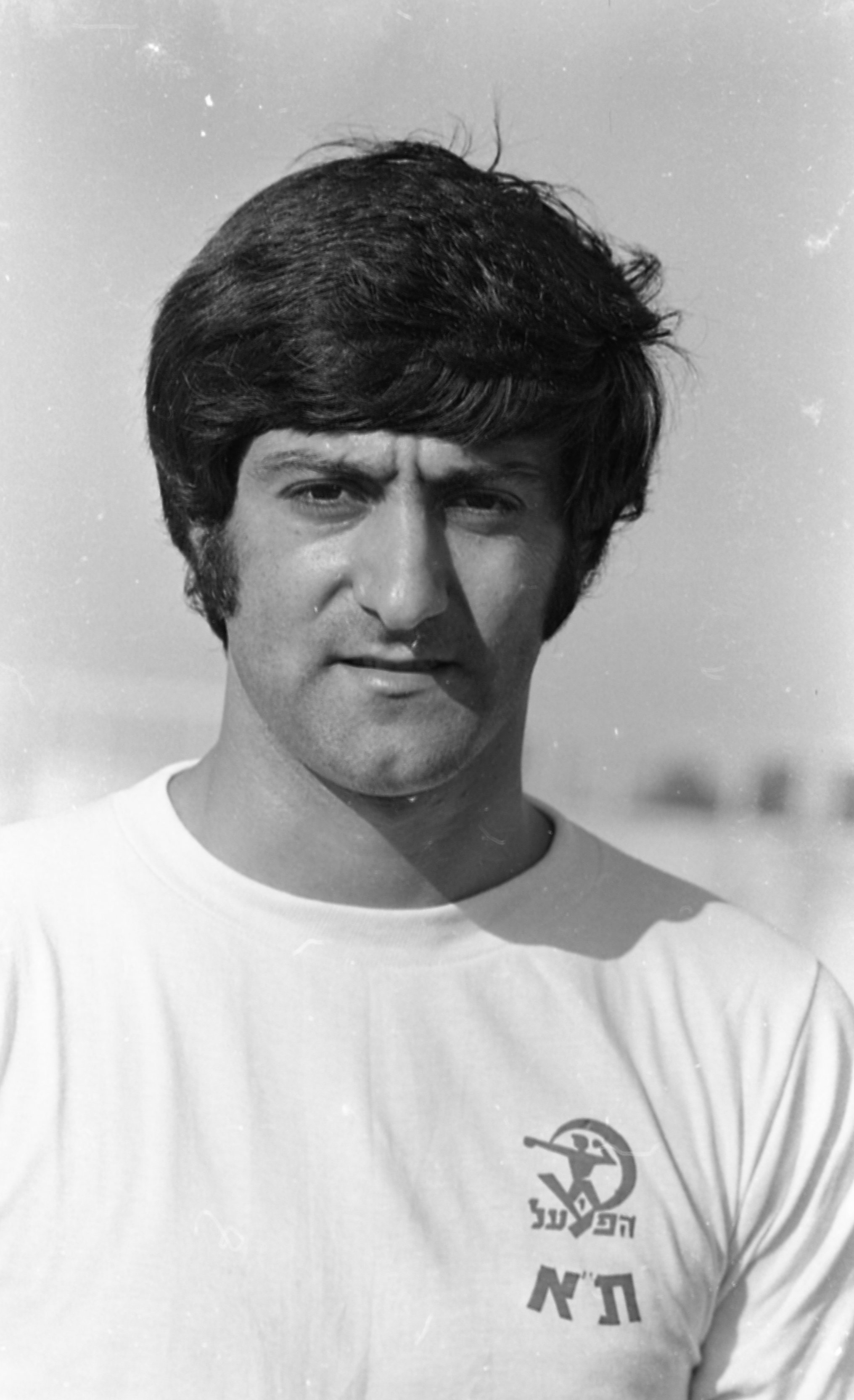

Personal information
- Full name: David Primovski / Primo
- Date of birth: May 5, 1946 (age 80)
- Place of birth: Bulgaria
- Position: Defensive midfielder

Senior career*
Years	Team	Apps	(Gls)
1963–1968	Hapoel Tel Aviv		
1968–1969	Baltimore Bays	34	(0)
1969–1975	Hapoel Tel Aviv		
1975–1976	New York Cosmos	11	(0)
1976–1977	Hapoel Ramat Gan		
1977–1979	Hapoel Holon		

International career
	Israel	32	(0)
- * Club domestic league appearances and goals

David Primo (Born Primovski Hebrew: דוד פרימו; born 5 May 1946 in Bulgaria) is a former Israeli international footballer who was part of the squad that competed at the 1970 World Cup, Israel's only world cup appearance.

In 1967, 1968, and 1969 he played for the Baltimore Bays in the North American Soccer League.
