= Zvi Rosen =

Israeli footballer

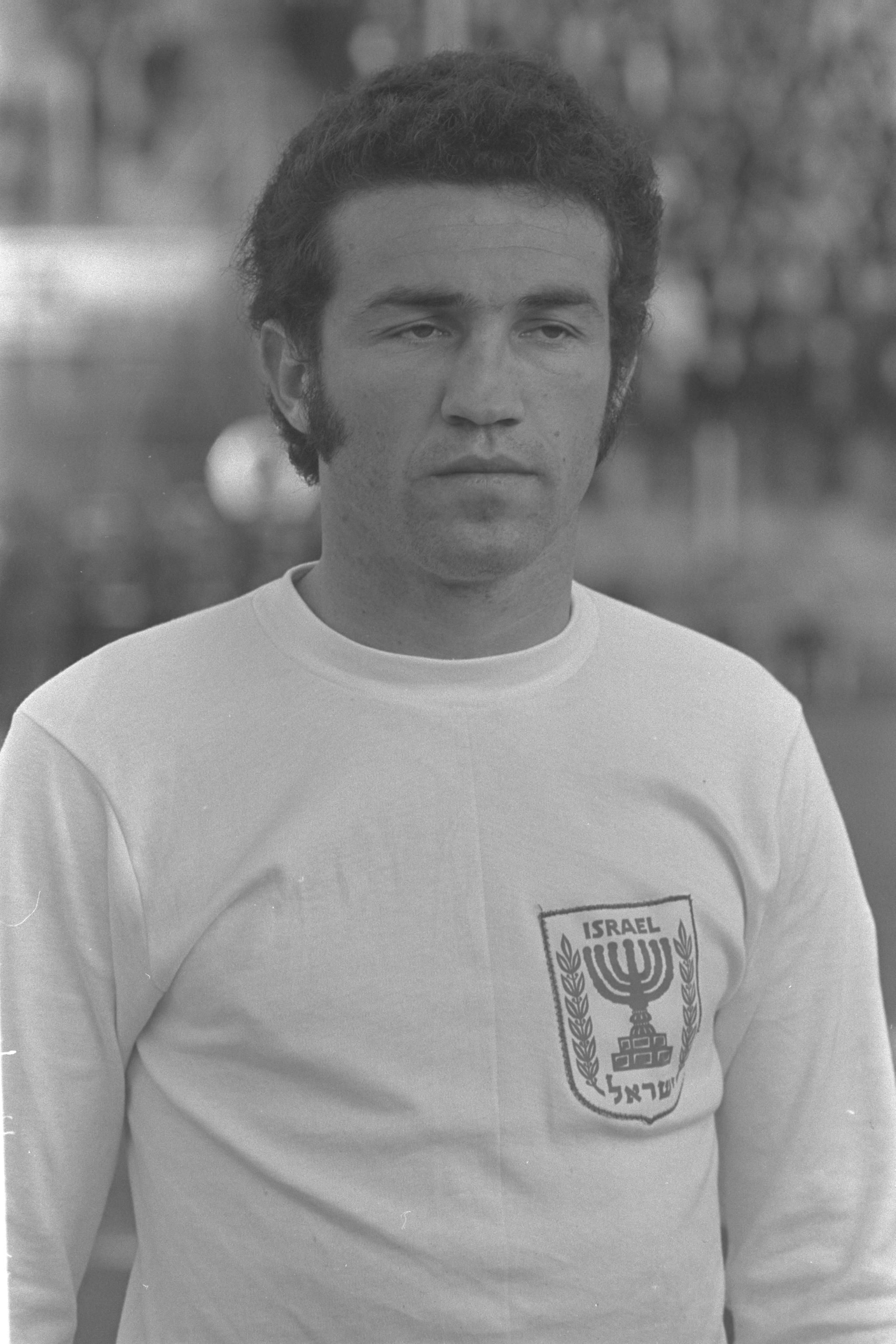
- Rosen in 1970

Personal information
- Date of birth: 23 June 1947 (age 79)
- Place of birth: Cologne, Allied-occupied Germany
- Height: 1.81 m (5 ft 11 1/2 in)
- Position: Defender

Senior career*
Years	Team	Apps	(Gls)
1963–1976	Maccabi Tel Aviv	305	(11)
1977–1980	Hapoel Yehud		

International career
1968–1974	Israel	42	(4)

Managerial career
- Hapoel Yehud
- 1982–1984: Hapoel Tel Aviv
- * Club domestic league appearances and goals

Zvi Rosen (Hebrew: צבי רוזן; born 23 June 1947) is an Israeli former international footballer who competed at the 1970 FIFA World Cup, as well as at the 1968 Summer Olympics.

Rosen played in 42 official games for the Israeli national side.
