= Israel national football team results (1960–1989) =

This article provides details of international football games played by the Israel national football team from 1960 to 1989.

== Results ==
=== 1960 ===
6 March 1960 Summer Olympics – Men's qualification	Israel	2–1	Greece	Ramat Gan Stadium, Ramat Gan
	Menchel 50'; Glazer 87'	Report	Linoxilakis 6'	Attendance: 45,000

3 April 1960 Summer Olympics – Men's qualification	Greece	2–1	Israel	Leoforos Alexandras Stadium, Athens
	Serafidhis 66', 80'	Report	Glazer 60'	Attendance: 18,000

10 April 1960 Summer Olympics – Men's qualification	Yugoslavia	1–2	Israel	Stadion Partizana, Belgrade
	Mujić 32'	Report	Levi 2', 67'	Attendance: 35,000

22 May Friendly	Israel	4–0	England	Ramat Gan Stadium, Ramat Gan
	Levi 34', 71' (pen.); Glazer 75'; Menchel 76'	Report		Attendance: 45,000

17 October 1960 AFC Asian Cup	South Korea	3–0	Israel	Hyochang Stadium, Seoul
	Cho Yoon-ok 17', 60'; Woo Sang-kwon 30'	Report		Attendance: 30,000

19 October 1960 AFC Asian Cup	South Vietnam	1–5	Israel	Hyochang Stadium, Seoul
	Trần Văn Nhung 68' (pen.)	Report	R. Levi 13'; Stelmach 18'; S. Levi 25'; Menchel 32'; Aharonskind 70'	Attendance: 15,000

23 October 1960 AFC Asian Cup	Israel	1–0	Taiwan	Hyochang Stadium, Seoul
	S. Levi 72'			Attendance: 25,000

13 November 1962 FIFA World Cup qualification	Cyprus	1–1	Israel	GSP Stadium (1902), Nicosia
	Shialis 29'	Report	Kofman 31'	Attendance: 11,000

27 November 1962 FIFA World Cup qualification	Israel	6–1	Cyprus	Ramat Gan Stadium, Ramat Gan
	Levi 14', 30', 66'; Stelmach 61', 88'; Nahari 34'	Report	Shialis 89' (pen.)	Attendance: 45,000

=== 1961 ===
14 March 1962 FIFA World Cup qualification	Israel	1–0	Ethiopia	Ramat Gan Stadium, Ramat Gan
	Glazer 69'	Report		Attendance: 35,000

19 March 1962 FIFA World Cup qualification	Israel	3–2	Ethiopia	Ramat Gan Stadium, Ramat Gan
	Glazer 27', 77'; Stelmach 59'	Report	Awad 31'; Vassalo 64'	Attendance: 30,000

15 October 1962 FIFA World Cup qualification	Israel	2–4	Italy	Ramat Gan Stadium, Ramat Gan
	Stelmach 15'; Young 38'	Report	Lojacono 53' (pen.); Altafini 79'; Corso 87', 90'	Attendance: 40,790

22 October Friendly	Israel	1–1	South Korea	Ramat Gan Stadium, Ramat Gan
	Stelmach 86'	Report	Chung Soon-Chun 10'	Attendance: 30,000

4 November 1962 FIFA World Cup qualification	Italy	6–0	Israel	Stadio Olimpico Grande Torino, Turin
	Sivori 16', 52', 65', 88'; Corso 59'; Angelillo 69'	Report		Attendance: 35,000

9 November Friendly	England	7–1	Israel	Elland Road, Leeds
	Byrne 15', 70'; F. Hill 18', 53'; Farmer 40'; S. Hill 74'; Harris 86'	Report	Levi 7'	Attendance: 12,419

14 December Friendly	Israel	0–2	Yugoslavia	Ramat Gan Stadium, Ramat Gan
		Report	Galić 35', 53'	Attendance: 25,000

=== 1962 ===
16 May Friendly	Turkey	1–0	Israel	Mithatpaşa Stadium, Istanbul
	Küçükandonyadis 55' (pen.)	(Report)		Attendance: 18,708

3 October Friendly	Israel	3–0	Ethiopia	Ramat Gan Stadium, Ramat Gan
	Levkovich 26' (pen.); Menchel 58'; Stelmach 72'	Report		Attendance: 30,000; Referee: Greg da Silva (Malaysia)

17 October Friendly	Israel	1–1	Austria	Ramat Gan Stadium, Ramat Gan
	Menchel 86'	Report	Flögel 74'	Attendance: 38,000

12 November Friendly	Israel	0–4	Sweden	Ramat Gan Stadium, Ramat Gan
		Report	Ohlsson 9'; Skiöld 12', 81', 86'	Attendance: 41,083 ll

25 November Friendly	Israel	0–2	Turkey	Ramat Gan Stadium, Ramat Gan
		(Report)	11', 14' Birol	Attendance: 35,000; Referee: (Greece) Dimosthenis Stathatos

=== 1963 ===
19 May Friendly	Israel	0–5	Brazil	Ramat Gan Stadium, Ramat Gan
		Report	Zequinha 12'; Quarentinha 17', 42'; Silveira 83', 87'	Attendance: 42,000

29 December 1964 Summer Olympics – Men's qualification	South Vietnam	0–1	Israel	Republic Stadium, Saigon
		Report	20' Reuven Young	Attendance: 25,000; Referee: Greg da Silva (Malaysia)

=== 1964 ===
2 January Friendly	Hong Kong	0–3	Israel	Government Stadium, Hong Kong
		Report	Mahalal 7', 72'; Spiegler 43' (pen.)	Attendance: 10,000

17 March 1964 Summer Olympics – Men's qualification	Israel	0–2	South Vietnam	Ramat Gan Stadium, Ramat Gan
		Report	27' Nguyễn Văn Quảng; 41' Nguyễn Văn Ngôn	Attendance: 36,937

17 May Friendly	Israel	0–4	England	Bloomfield Stadium, Tel Aviv
		Report	Hinton 3', 46'; Tambling 10'; Hurst 20'	Attendance: 20,000

26 May 1964 AFC Asian Cup	Israel	1–0	Hong Kong	Ramat Gan Stadium, Ramat Gan
	Spiegler 76'	Report		Attendance: 25,000

29 May 1964 AFC Asian Cup	Israel	2–0	India	Bloomfield Stadium, Tel Aviv
	Spiegler 29' (pen.); Aharoni 76'	Report		Attendance: 20,000

=== 1966 ===
6 April Friendly	Israel	7–1	Finland	Bloomfield Stadium, Tel Aviv
	Spiegel 15', 32'; Spiegler 39', 54'; Talbi 46'; Young 52'; Romano 89'	Report	Pahlman 35' (pen.)	Attendance: 15,000

8 May Friendly	Finland	0–3	Israel	Helsinki Olympic Stadium, Helsinki
		Report	Young 74'; Stelmach 75', 87'	Attendance: 14,788

15 June Friendly	Israel	1–2	Uruguay	Ramat Gan Stadium, Ramat Gan
	Spiegler 71'	Report	Abbadie 67', 71'	Attendance: 35,000

12 October Friendly	Israel	1–3	Yugoslavia	Bloomfield Stadium, Tel Aviv
	Spiegler 35'	Report	Zambata 34'; Bukal 42', 86'	Attendance: 17,000

19 October Friendly	Netherlands	4–1	Israel	Cambuur Stadion, Leeuwarden
	Schwager 2' (o.g.); Jansen 7', 89' van der Kuijlen 37'	Report	Young 78'	Attendance: 8,500

22 October Friendly	Switzerland	4–0	Israel	Charmilles Stadium, Geneva
	Allemann 7'; Künzli 50', 59'; Zappella 83'	Report		Attendance: 4,915

26 October Friendly	Denmark	3–1	Israel	Parken Stadium, Copenhagen
	Throst 48'; Hansen 71'; Møller 82'	Report	Asis 4'	Attendance: 13,500

3 December Friendly	Israel	1–2	Romania	Bloomfield Stadium, Tel Aviv
	Borba 17'	Report	Badea 37'; Pîrcălab 52' (pen.)	Attendance: 18,000

=== 1967 ===
16 May Friendly	Israel	1–2	Scotland	Ramat Gan Stadium, Ramat Gan
	Giora Spiegel 40'		Morgan 22'; Ferguson 83'	Attendance: 27,000

7 September Friendly	Netherlands	1–2	Israel	Stadion Galgenwaard, Utrecht
	de Wit 66'		Talbi 42', 81'	Attendance: 2,000

=== 1968 ===
10 January Friendly	Israel	0–2	Belgium	Bloomfield Stadium, Tel Aviv
			Devrindt 11'; Puis 36'	Attendance: 14,000

14 February Friendly	Israel	2–1	Switzerland	Bloomfield Stadium, Tel Aviv
	Spiegler 43', 67'		Künzli 49'	Attendance: 8,000

19 February Friendly	Israel	0–3	Sweden	Bloomfield Stadium, Tel Aviv
			Ejderstedt 25', 27', 44'	Attendance: 18,000

17 March 1968 Summer Olympics – Men's qualification	Israel	7–0	Ceylon	Bloomfield Stadium, Tel Aviv
	George Borba 1', 63'; Mordechai Spiegler 11', 59', 85'; W.N.C. Perera 30' (o.g.); Giora Spiegel 47'			Attendance: 14,000

22 March 1968 Summer Olympics – Men's qualification	Israel	4–0	Ceylon	Bloomfield Stadium, Tel Aviv
	Giora Spiegel 55'; Rahamim Talbi 62'; Shmuel Rosenthal 66'; George Borba 77'			Attendance: 10,000

12 May 1968 AFC Asian Cup	Hong Kong	1–6	Israel	Amjadieh Stadium, Tehran
	Yuan Kuan Yick 76'		Spiegler 9', 53'; Spiegel 52', 65'; Romano 61', 71'	Attendance: 30,000

14 May 1968 AFC Asian Cup	Burma	1–0	Israel	Amjadieh Stadium, Tehran
	Suk Bahadur 42'			Attendance: 30,000

17 May 1968 AFC Asian Cup	Israel	4–1	Taiwan	Amjadieh Stadium, Tehran
	Romano 2', 60'; Rosenthal 70'; Spiegel 76'		Li Huan-wen 45+1'	Attendance: 20,000

19 May 1968 AFC Asian Cup	Iran	2–1	Israel	Amjadieh Stadium, Tehran
	Behzadi 75'; Ghelichkhani 86'		Spiegel 56'	Attendance: 30,000

10 September Friendly	Israel	2–3	Northern Ireland	Bloomfield Stadium, Tel Aviv
	Spiegler 52'; Talbi 63'		Irvine 5', 39'; Dougan 30'	Attendance: 21,000

15 September Friendly	United States	3–3	Israel	Yankee Stadium, New York City
	Roy 48'; Millar 80', 84'		Spiegler 3', 10'; Spiegel 39'	Attendance: 10,118

25 September Friendly	United States	0–4	Israel	Temple Stadium, Philadelphia
			Spiegler 71', 79', 83', 89'	Attendance: 7,161

13 October 1968 Summer Olympics	Israel	5–3	Ghana	Estadio Nou Camp, León
	Spiegel 11' 75'; Feigenbaum 16' 30' 70'		Jabir 18' 79'; Amosa 35'	Attendance: 8,000

15 October 1968 Summer Olympics	Israel	3–1	El Salvador	Estadio Nou Camp, León
	Talbi 20'; Spiegler 44'; Bar 85'		Martínez 35'	Attendance: 5,000

17 October 1968 Summer Olympics	Hungary	2–0	Israel	Estadio Jalisco, Guadalajara
	A. Dunai 40' 75'			Attendance: 25,000

20 October 1968 Summer Olympics	Bulgaria	1–1	Israel	Estadio Nou Camp, León
	Hristakiev 5'		Feigenbaum 89'	Attendance: 8,000

=== 1969 ===
19 February Friendly	Israel	2–3	Sweden	Bloomfield Stadium, Tel Aviv
	Spiegel 14' (pen.); Young 21'		Ejderstedt 24'; Ejderstedt 30'; Andersson 82'	Attendance: 18,000

12 March Friendly	Israel	3–3	Greece	Bloomfield Stadium, Tel Aviv
	Young 14'; Talbi 64'; Feigenbaum 72'		Gioutsos 8', 23', 48'	Attendance: 15,000

23 April Friendly	Israel	1–1	Australia	Ramat Gan Stadium, Ramat Gan
	Feigenbaum 20'		Kreuz 39'	Attendance: 32,000

28 May Friendly	Greece	1–3	Israel	Leoforos Stadium, Athens
	Intzoglou 18'		Talbi 4'; Young 60'; Spigel 80'	Attendance: 5,000

25 August Friendly	Sweden	3–1	Israel	Råsunda Stadium, Solna
	Danielsson 10', 74'; Eriksson 20' (pen.)		Talbi 5'	Attendance: 11,286

2 September Friendly	West Germany (West Germany)	1–1	Israel	Stadion an den sieben, Frechen
	Hommrich 90+2'		Feigenbaum 62'	Attendance: 2,500

28 September 1970 FIFA World Cup qualification	Israel	4–0	New Zealand	Ramat Gan Stadium, Ramat Gan
	Spiegler 48'; Spiegel 65'; Feigenbaum 72', 86'			Attendance: 26,669

1 October 1970 FIFA World Cup qualification	Israel	2–0	New Zealand	Ramat Gan Stadium, Ramat Gan
	Spiegler 24'; Spiegel 33'			Attendance: 10,898

4 December 1970 FIFA World Cup qualification	Israel	1–0	Australia	Ramat Gan Stadium, Ramat Gan
	Spiegel 18'			Attendance: 41,889

14 December 1970 FIFA World Cup qualification	Australia	1–1	Israel	Sydney Sports Ground, Sydney
	Watkiss 88'		Spiegler 79'	Attendance: 3,000

=== 1970 ===
14 January Friendly	Israel	0–1	Romania	Bloomfield Stadium, Tel Aviv
			Grozea 80'	Attendance: 16,000

20 January Friendly	Israel	1–2	Romania	Bloomfield Stadium, Tel Aviv
	Shum 34'		Oblemenco 8'; Ivăncescu 60'	Attendance: 2,000

28 January Friendly	Israel	0–1	Netherlands	Bloomfield Stadium, Tel Aviv
			Brokamp 5'	Attendance: 17,000

22 March Friendly	Ethiopia	1–5	Israel	Addis Ababa Stadium, Addis Ababa
	Ainslie 12'		Feigenbaum 15', 30', 82'; Spiegler 43', 71'	Attendance: 15,231

2 June 1970 FIFA World Cup	Uruguay	2–0	Israel	Estadio Cuauhtémoc, Puebla
	Maneiro 23'; Mujica 52'			Attendance: 20,654

7 June 1970 FIFA World Cup	Israel	1–1	Sweden	Estadio Nemesio Díez, Toluca
	Spiegler 56'		Turesson 53'	Attendance: 9,624

11 June 1970 FIFA World Cup	Israel	0–0	Italy	Estadio Nemesio Díez, Toluca
				Attendance: 9,890

10 November Friendly	Israel	0–1	Australia	Ramat Gan Stadium, Ramat Gan
			Richards 50'	Attendance: 25,000

=== 1971 ===
17 February Friendly	Israel	0–2	Italy	Stadio della Vittoria, Bari
			Pulici 23'; Bigon 78'	Attendance: 13,298

12 March Friendly	Israel	2–1	Sweden	Bloomfield Stadium, Tel Aviv
	Feigenbaum 2'; Spiegel 10'		Eklund 88'	Attendance: 14,000

11 November Friendly	Australia	2–2	Israel	Lang Park, Brisbane,
	Tolson 19'; Alston 72'		Calderon 11'; Spiegler 63'	Attendance: 5,040

14 November Friendly	Australia	1–0	Israel	Sydney Sports Ground, Sydney
	Ainslie 12'			Attendance: 11,282

21 November Friendly	Australia	1–3	Israel	Olympic Park Stadium, Melbourne
	Baartz 87'		Rosen 15'; Shaharabani 46', 84'	Attendance: 9,639

=== 1972 ===
23 February Friendly	Israel	2–1	Norway	Bloomfield Stadium, Tel Aviv
	Bar-Nur 32', 73'		Johansen 29'	Attendance: 12,000

1 March Friendly	Israel	0–1	Italy	Bloomfield Stadium, Tel Aviv
			Pulici 20'	Attendance: 17,545

22 March Olympic qualifier	Israel	3–0	Ceylon	Bogyoke Aung San Stadium, Rangoon
	Calderon 12'; Bar-Nur 52'; Borba 70'			Attendance: 50,000

28 March Olympic qualifier	Israel	1–0	India	Bogyoke Aung San Stadium, Rangoon
	Spiegler 50'			Attendance: 60,000

30 March Olympic qualifier	Israel	1–0	Indonesia	Bogyoke Aung San Stadium, Rangoon
	Sarusi 47'			Attendance: 40,000

1 April Olympic qualifier	Israel	0–0 (2–4 p)	Thailand	Bogyoke Aung San Stadium, Rangoon
				Attendance: 60,000
	Penalties
	Rosen (penalty scored); Shum (penalty scored); Dror Bar-Nur (penalty missed); Bar (penalty missed)

=== 1973 ===
20 February Friendly	Israel	1–1	Argentina	Bloomfield Stadium, Tel Aviv
	Shum 31'		Heredia 36'	Attendance: 22,000

16 May 1974 FIFA World Cup qualification	Israel	2–1	Japan	Municipal Stadium, Seoul
	Onana 5', 61'		Hirasawa 28'	Attendance: 4,091

19 May 1974 FIFA World Cup qualification	Israel	3–0	Malaysia	Municipal Stadium, Seoul
	Farkash 50'; Shum 62'; Onana 82'			Attendance: 6,352

21 May 1974 FIFA World Cup qualification	Israel	6–0	Thailand	Municipal Stadium, Seoul
	Borba 12'; Spiegler 62'; Shum 69'; Rozen 73', 84'; Onana 78'			Attendance: 5,554

23 May 1974 FIFA World Cup qualification	South Korea	0–0	Israel	Municipal Stadium, Seoul
				Attendance: 6,222

26 May 1974 FIFA World Cup qualification	Israel	1–0	Japan	Municipal Stadium, Seoul
	Onana 96'			Attendance: 6,008

28 May 1974 FIFA World Cup qualification	Israel	0–1	South Korea	Municipal Stadium, Seoul
			Cha Bum-kun 109'	Attendance: 6,213

19 July Friendly	Israel	1–2	Uruguay	Ramat Gan Stadium, Ramat Gan
	Damti 49'		Milar 28'; Morena 74'	Attendance: 40,000

13 November Friendly	Israel	3–1	United States	Bloomfield Stadium, Tel Aviv
	Peretz 9'; Rosen 42'; Macmel 46'		Roy 13'	Attendance: 5,000

15 November Friendly	Israel	2–0	United States	Vasermil Stadium, Be'er Sheva
	Damti 12'; Peretz 15'			Attendance: 3,000

=== 1974 ===
28 May Friendly	Israel	2–1	Australia	Bloomfield Stadium, Tel Aviv
	Feygenbaum 58', 88'	Report	Mackay 89'	Attendance: 14,000

3 September 1974 Asian Games	Israel	8–3	Malaysia	Aryamehr Stadium, Tehran
	Onana 4', 18'; Shalom Schwarz 10'; Feigenbaum 39'; Damti 48', 67', 89'; Massuari 75'	Report	Zawawi 61' (pen.); Ahmad 75', 80'	Attendance: 5,000

5 September 1974 Asian Games	Israel	6–0	Philippines	Aryamehr Stadium, Tehran
	Schweizer 16', 42'; Damti 24'; Shum 31'; Onana 41'; Feigenbaum 90'	Report		Attendance: 60,000

7 September 1974 Asian Games	Japan	0–3	Israel	Aryamehr Stadium, Tehran
		Report	Feigenbaum 55', 63'; Damti 86'	Attendance: 30,000

10 September 1974 Asian Games	Israel	3–0	Burma	Aryamehr Stadium, Tehran
	Yehoshua Feigenbaum 31'; Moshe Schweitzer 49'; Gidi Damti 89'	Report		Attendance: 10,000

15 September 1974 Asian Games	Israel	0–1	Iran	Aryamehr Stadium, Tehran
		Report	Shum 30' (o.g.)	Attendance: 100,000

4 December Friendly	Israel	0–1	Romania	Bloomfield Stadium, Tel Aviv
		Report	Sameş 80'	Attendance: 7,000

=== 1975 ===
6 January Friendly	Israel	3–0	United States	Bloomfield Stadium, Tel Aviv
	Feigenbaum 31', 75', 88'	Report		Attendance: 6,000

15 January Friendly	Israel	1–0	United States	Ironi Beit Shean Stadium, Beit She'an
	Leventhal 70'	Report		Attendance: 3,500

8 June Friendly	United States	0–5	Israel	Alumni Memorial Field, Mount Vernon
		Report	Hansen 68'; Schwarz 36'; Schweitzer 41'; Rosen 43' (pen.); Shum 57'	Attendance: 4,500

20 October Friendly	Israel	1–0	Mexico	Bloomfield Stadium, Tel Aviv
	Schweitzer 51'	Report		Attendance: 14,000

=== 1976 ===
4 February Friendly	Israel	0–1	Denmark	Bloomfield Stadium, Tel Aviv
		Report	Hansen 68'	Attendance: 7,000

3 March Friendly	Israel	1–1	Northern Ireland	Bloomfield Stadium, Tel Aviv
	Damti 36'	Report	Lev 58' (o.g.)	Attendance: 9,000

31 March Olympic qualifier	Japan	0–3	Israel	Municipal stadium, Seoul
		Report	Damti 9'; Peretz 17'; Oz 62'	Attendance: 20,000

4 April Olympic qualifier	South Korea	1–3	Israel	Municipal stadium, Seoul
	Jong-duk 19'	Report	Schweitzer 20'; Damti 51', 73'	Attendance: 35,000

11 April Olympic qualifier	Israel	4–1	Japan	Ramat Gan Stadium, Ramat Gan
	Schweitzer 8'; Damti 19'; Shum 53', 73' (pen.)	Report	Matsunaga 40'	Attendance: 35,000

28 April Olympic qualifier	Israel	0–0	South Korea	Ramat Gan Stadium, Ramat Gan
		Report		Attendance: 22,000

19 July 1976 Summer Olympics	Israel	0–0	Guatemala	Varsity Stadium, Toronto
		Report		Attendance: 9,500

21 July 1976 Summer Olympics	Mexico	2–2	Israel	Olympic Stadium, Montreal
	Rangel 19' 44'	Report	Oz 51'; Shum 55' (pen.)	Attendance: 36,569

23 July 1976 Summer Olympics	France	1–1	Israel	Olympic Stadium, Montreal
	Platini 80' (pen.)	Report	Peretz 75'	Attendance: 33,639

25 July 1976 Summer Olympics	Brazil	4–1	Israel	Varsity Stadium, Toronto
	Jarbas 56' 74'; Erivélto 72'; Júnior 88'	Report	Peretz 80'	Attendance: 18,601

22 September Friendly	Greece	0–1	Israel	Kostas Davourlis Stadium, Patras
		Report	Tabak 58'	Attendance: 5,000

3 November Friendly	Israel	1–1	Australia	Ramat Gan Stadium, Ramat Gan
	Wilson 56'	Report	Damti 42'	Attendance: 6,000

15 December Friendly	Israel	1–3	Austria	Ramat Gan Stadium, Ramat Gan
	Peretz 25'	Report	Prohaska 37'; Schachner 38'; Krankl 55'	Attendance: 8,000

29 December Friendly	Israel	0–1	Germany	Ramat Gan Stadium, Ramat Gan
		Report	Hammes 44'	Attendance: 3,500

=== 1977 ===
26 January Friendly	Israel	1–1	Greece	Bloomfield Stadium, Tel Aviv
	Schweitzer 13'	Report	Galakos 1'	Attendance: 7,000

9 February Friendly	Israel	3–3	Thailand	National Stadium, Bangkok
	Peretz 31'; Malmilian 36'; Machnes 88'	Report	Khemngern 13', 17'; Maklamtong 55'	Attendance: 7,000

12 February Friendly	Australia	1–1	Israel	Olympic Park Stadium, Melbourne
	Ollerton 58'	Report	Damti 10'	Attendance: 8,000

16 February Friendly	Australia	1–1	Israel	Sydney Sports Ground, Sydney
	Muniz 59'	Report	Schweitzer 72'	Attendance: 6,900

27 February 1978 FIFA World Cup qualification	Israel	0–0	South Korea	Ramat Gan Stadium, Ramat Gan
		Report		Attendance: 24,400

6 March 1978 FIFA World Cup qualification	Israel	2–0	Japan	Ramat Gan Stadium, Ramat Gan
	Machnes 43'; Bar 57'	Report		Attendance: 9,300

10 March 1978 FIFA World Cup qualification	Japan	0–2	Israel	Ramat Gan Stadium, Ramat Gan
		Report	Machnes 41'; Peretz 54'	Attendance: 7,300

20 March 1978 FIFA World Cup qualification	South Korea	3–1	Israel	Municipal Stadium, Seoul
	Cha Bum-Kun 23'; Park Sang-In 86'; Choi Jong-Duk 88'	Report	Malmilian 76'	Attendance: 38,718

=== 1978 ===
8 February Friendly	Israel	2–0	Denmark	Bloomfield Stadium, Tel Aviv
	Cohen 45'; Machnes 49'	Report		Attendance: 3,000

22 February Friendly	Israel	1–2	Netherlands	Ramat Gan Stadium, Ramat Gan
	Peretz 41'	Report	Rensenbrink 31' (pen.); La Ling 65'	Attendance: 25,000

18 April Friendly	Israel	2–0	Netherlands	Yud-Alef Stadium, Ashdod
	Avitan 9', 43'	Report		Attendance: 1,000

15 November Friendly	Israel	1–0	Belgium	Bloomfield Stadium, Tel Aviv
	Peretz 57'	Report		Attendance: 12,000

19 December Friendly	Israel	1–1	Romania	Bloomfield Stadium, Tel Aviv
	Malmilian 54'	Report	Stan 77'	Attendance: 7,000

=== 1979 ===
30 January Friendly	Israel	0–1	Austria	Bloomfield Stadium, Tel Aviv
		Report	Oberacher 55'	Attendance: 6,000

14 February Friendly	Israel	4–1	Greece	Ramat Gan Stadium, Ramat Gan
	Shum 21'; Peretz 29', 41', 80'	Report	Delikaris 40'	Attendance: 5,369

28 March Olympic qualifier	Israel	0–2	Belgium	Bloomfield Stadium, Tel Aviv
		Report	Sanders 77'; Hoste 90'	Attendance: 17,000

9 May Olympic qualifier	Spain	1–1	Israel	Estadio de La Condomina, Murcia
	Canito 90'	Report	Tabak 11'	Attendance: 20,000

26 September Olympic qualifier	Spain	3–0	Israel	Ramat Gan Stadium, Ramat Gan
	Muñoz 53'; Portugal 59', 85'	Report		Attendance: 25,000

4 October Olympic qualifier	Netherlands	3–4	Israel	De Oude Meerdijk, Emmen
	Van Dam 40'; Graafland 53'; Heemskerk 55'	Report	Damti 72', 89'; Ouderland 77' (o.g.); Peretz 86'	Attendance: 2,500

10 October Olympic qualifier	Belgium	0–0	Israel	Stade Joseph Marien, Forest
		Report		Attendance: 3,000

31 October Olympic qualifier	Israel	1–1	Netherlands	Vasermil Stadium, Be'er Sheva
	Damti 69'	Report	Graafland 75'	Attendance: 2,000

=== 1980 ===
26 March 1982 FIFA World Cup qualification	Israel	0–0	Northern Ireland	Ramat Gan Stadium, Ramat Gan
		Report		Attendance: 40,000

18 June 1982 FIFA World Cup qualification	Sweden	1–1	Israel	Råsunda Stadium, Stockholm
	Ramberg 35'	Report	Damti 80'	Attendance: 39,831

12 November 1982 FIFA World Cup qualification	Israel	0–0	Sweden	Ramat Gan Stadium, Ramat Gan
		Report		Attendance: 45,000

2 December Friendly	Australia	1–0	Israel	Vasermil Stadium, Be'er Sheva
	G. Cole 28' (pen.)	Report		Attendance: 5,000

17 December 1982 FIFA World Cup qualification	Portugal	3–0	Israel	Estádio da Luz, Lisbon
	Coelho 33', 72'; Jordão 36'	Report		Attendance: 60,000

=== 1981 ===
25 February 1982 FIFA World Cup qualification	Israel	0–1	Scotland	Ramat Gan Stadium, Ramat Gan
		Report	Dalglish 54'	Attendance: 45,000

8 April Friendly	Israel	2–1	Romania	Bloomfield Stadium, Tel Aviv
	Sinai 3'; Mizrahi 89'	Report	Sandu 4'	Attendance: 3,000

28 April 1982 FIFA World Cup qualification	Scotland	3–1	Israel	Hampden Park, Glasgow
	Robertson 21' (pen.), 30' (pen.); Provan 54'	Report	Sinai 56'	Attendance: 61,489

28 October 1982 FIFA World Cup qualification	Israel	4–1	Portugal	Ramat Gan Stadium, Ramat Gan
	Tabak 6', 18', 30'; Damti 14'	Report	Jordão 8'	Attendance: 16,192

18 November 1982 FIFA World Cup qualification	Northern Ireland	1–0	Israel	Windsor Park, Belfast
	Armstrong 27'	Report		Attendance: 38,000

=== 1983 ===
15 February Friendly	Israel	3–2	Belgium	Ramat Gan Stadium, Ramat Gan
	Armeli 22', 24', 44'	Report	Adiv 16' (o.g.); Hoste 87'	Attendance: 500

8 June Olympic qualifier	Germany	2–0	Israel	Stadion am Zoo, Wuppertal
	Hartwig 3'; Wass 86'	Report		Attendance: 9,000

26 September Friendly	Israel	2–2	Uruguay	Bloomfield Stadium, Tel Aviv
	Armeli 48'; Levi 63'	Report	Aguilera 10', 83'	Attendance: 7,000

30 October Olympic qualifier	Israel	1–0	Portugal	Bloomfield Stadium, Tel Aviv
	Cohen 76'	Report		Attendance: 8,000

8 November Friendly	Israel	1–1	Romania	Bloomfield Stadium, Tel Aviv
	Malmilian 49'	Report	Coraş 75'	Attendance: 3,500

20 November Olympic qualifier	Germany	1–0	Israel	Bloomfield Stadium, Tel Aviv
	Schatzschneider 5'	Report		Attendance: 17,000

=== 1984 ===
11 January Olympic qualifier	Israel	1–2	Portugal	Estádio do Restelo, Lisbon
	Yani 16'	Report	Murça 26'; Frederico 79'	Attendance: 2,500

4 April Friendly	Israel	3–0	Republic of Ireland	Bloomfield Stadium, Tel Aviv
	Ohana 3'; Armeli 62'; Sinai 65'	Report		Attendance: 9,000

11 April Friendly	Romania	0–0	Israel	Stadionul Municipal (Oradea), Oradea
		Report		Attendance: 25,000

10 June Friendly	Israel	0–0	Wales	Ramat Gan Stadium, Ramat Gan
		Report		Attendance: 3,000

6 September Friendly	Israel	2–1	Malta	YMCA Stadium, Jerusalem
	Malmilian 34', 78'	Report	Muscat 21'	Attendance: 300

9 October Friendly	Greece	2–2	Israel	Olympic Stadium, Athens
	Semertzidis 15'; Manolas 84'	Report	Cohen 13'; Ohana 51'	Attendance: 2,500

16 October Friendly	Northern Ireland	3–0	Israel	Windsor Park, Belfast
	Whiteside 3'; Quinn 26'; Doherty 44'	Report		Attendance: 10,000

21 November Friendly	Israel	1–1	Romania	Municipal Stadium, Petah Tikva
	Ohana 33'	Report	Lăcătuş 74'	Attendance: 2,000

19 December Friendly	Israel	2–0	Luxembourg	Municipal Stadium, Petah Tikva
	Malmilian 47' (pen.); Ohana 51'	Report		Attendance: 600

=== 1985 ===
9 January Friendly	Israel	0–2	Greece	Bloomfield Stadium, Tel Aviv
		Report	Anastopoulos 23'; Kofidis 72'	Attendance: 3,000

27 February Friendly	Israel	0–0	Republic of Ireland	Ramat Gan Stadium, Ramat Gan
		Report		Attendance: 3,000

1 May Friendly	Israel	1–1	Sweden	Ramat Gan Stadium, Ramat Gan
	Ohana 34'	Report	Prytz 31'	Attendance: 6,727

3 September 1986 FIFA World Cup qualification	Chinese Taipei	0–6	Israel	Ramat Gan Stadium, Ramat Gan
		Report	28', 35', 74' Turk; 39' Armeli; 53', 90' Malmilian	Attendance: 30,000

8 September 1986 FIFA World Cup qualification	Israel	5–0	Chinese Taipei	Ramat Gan Stadium, Ramat Gan
	Cohen 7'; Armeli 18'; Ohana 56', 72', 79'	Report		Attendance: 10,000

8 October 1986 FIFA World Cup qualification	Israel	1–2	Australia	Ramat Gan Stadium, Ramat Gan
	Armeli 65'	Report	46' Mitchell; 50' Kosmina	Attendance: 45,000

20 October 1986 FIFA World Cup qualification	Australia	1–1	Israel	Olympic Park, Melbourne
	Ratcliffe 32'	Report	47' Cohen	Attendance: 27,000

26 October 1986 FIFA World Cup qualification	New Zealand	3–1	Israel	Mount Smart Stadium, Auckland
	Rufer 3'; Dunford 30'; Walker 67'	Report	23' Armeli	Attendance: 10,060

10 November 1986 FIFA World Cup qualification	Israel	3–0	New Zealand	Ramat Gan Stadium, Ramat Gan
	Cohen 67'; Selecter 75'; Armeli 85'	Report		Attendance: 4,500

=== 1986 ===
28 January Friendly	Israel	0–1	Scotland	Ramat Gan Stadium, Ramat Gan
		Report	MxStay 59'	Attendance: 7,000

26 February Friendly	Israel	1–2	England	Ramat Gan Stadium, Ramat Gan
	Ohana 7'	Report	Robson 51', 86' (pen.)	Attendance: 15,000

4 May Friendly	Israel	2–7	Argentina	Ramat Gan Stadium, Ramat Gan
	Sinai 32'; Malmilian 49'	Report	Almirón 5', 57', 62'; Maradona 22', 75'; Borghi 59'; Tapia 90'	Attendance: 3,000

8 October Friendly	Israel	2–4	Romania	Ramat Gan Stadium, Ramat Gan
	Malmilian 2'; Cohen 84'	Report	Piţurcă 35', 75'; Bölöni 55'; Cămătaru 60'	Attendance: 3,500

=== 1987 ===
18 February Friendly	Israel	1–1	Northern Ireland	Ramat Gan Stadium, Ramat Gan
	Merili 87'	Report	Penney 38'	Attendance: 4,081

25 March Friendly	Israel	0–2	Germany	Ramat Gan Stadium, Ramat Gan
		Report	Thon 9'; Matthäus 79' (pen.)	Attendance: 18,000

8 April Friendly	Romania	3–2	Israel	Stadionul Municipal, Brașov
	Câmpeanu 21'; Belodedici 38'; Kramer 83'	Report	Brailovsky 19'; Tikva 80'	Attendance: 30,000

19 May Friendly	Switzerland	1–0	Israel	Stadion Brügglifeld, Aarau
	Bonvin 66'	Report		Attendance: 3,500

1 June Friendly	Israel	0–4	Brazil	Ramat Gan Stadium, Ramat Gan
		Report	Romário 15', 72'; Dunga 48'; João Paulo 83'	Attendance: 45,000

10 November Friendly	Republic of Ireland	5–0	Israel	Lansdowne Road, Dublin
	John Byrne 25'; David Kelly 46', 56', 71' (pen.); Quinn 83'	Report		Attendance: 9,500

2 December Friendly	Israel	1–1	Malta	Kiryat Eliezer Stadium, Haifa
	Ovadia 7'	Report	Mizzi 44' (pen.)	Attendance: 2,500

16 December Friendly	Israel	0–2	Switzerland	Ramat Gan Stadium, Ramat Gan
		Report	Sutter 37'; Bonvin 61'	Attendance: 4,000

=== 1988 ===
19 January Friendly	Israel	2–3	Belgium	Ramat Gan Stadium, Ramat Gan
	Malmilian 57'; Tikva 69'	Report	Degryse 15'; Van der Linden 19'; Grün 47'	Attendance: 7,000

27 January Friendly	Israel	1–1	France	Ramat Gan Stadium, Ramat Gan
	Cohen 69'	Report	Stopyra 60'	Attendance: 5,000

3 February Friendly	Israel	0–2	Romania	Kiryat Eliezer Stadium, Haifa
		Report	Bölöni 15'; Ciucă 70'	Attendance: 5,000

10 February Friendly	Israel	1–3	Poland	Ramat Gan Stadium, Ramat Gan
	Rosenthal 35'	Report	Kubicki 45'; Prusik 46'; Kosecki 89'	Attendance: 6,500

17 February Friendly	Israel	0–0	England	Ramat Gan Stadium, Ramat Gan
		Report		Attendance: 5,000

6 March Olympic qualifier	Australia	2–0	Israel	Olympic Park Stadium, Melbourne
	Yankos 70' (pen.); Farina 91'	Report		Attendance: 9,518

9 March Olympic qualifier	New Zealand	0–2	Israel	Hindmarsh Stadium, Adelaide
		Report	Cohen 17'; Ivanir 55'	Attendance: 7,000

13 March Olympic qualifier	Israel	5–1	Chinese Taipei	Sydney Football Stadium, Sydney
	Brailovsky 7', 79'; Malmilian 14', 72'; Levin 28'	Report	Sing-an 54'	Attendance: 10,498

20 March Olympic qualifier	Australia	0–0	Israel	Queen Elizabeth II Stadium, Christchurch
		Report		Attendance: 1,000

23 March Olympic qualifier	Chinese Taipei	0–9	Israel	Athletic Park, Wellington
		Report	Rosenthal 32'; Cohen 43'; Malmilian 50' (pen.); Levin 58', 60', 66'; Tikva 64', 82', 87'	Attendance: 400

27 March Olympic qualifier	New Zealand	0–1	Israel	Eden Park, Auckland
		Report	Levin 5'	Attendance: 1,000

18 October Friendly	Israel	2–0	Malta	Vasermil Stadium, Be'er Sheva
	Sinai 1'; Driks 86'	Report		Attendance: 3,000

23 November Friendly	Romania	3–0	Israel	Stadionul Municipal, Sibiu
	Cămătaru 23'; Mateuţ 31', 40'	Report		Attendance: 9,000

=== 1989 ===
4 January Friendly	Israel	0–2	Netherlands	Ramat Gan Stadium, Ramat Gan
		Report	Wouters 9'; Van Loen 10'	Attendance: 19,000

11 January Friendly	Malta	1–2	Israel	Ta' Qali National Stadium, Ta' Qali
	Carabott 32'	Report	Menahem 12'; Sinai 89'	Attendance: 2,441

8 February Friendly	Israel	3–3	Wales	Ramat Gan Stadium, Ramat Gan
	Klinger 6'; Alon 7'; Driks 73'	Report	11' Barry Horne; 57' (og.) Eitan Aharoni; 87' Malcolm Allen	Attendance: 6,000

5 March 1990 FIFA World Cup qualification	Israel	1–0	New Zealand	Ramat Gan Stadium, Ramat Gan
	Rosenthal 7'	Report		Attendance: 44,500

19 March 1990 FIFA World Cup qualification	Israel	1–1	Australia	Ramat Gan Stadium, Ramat Gan
	Ohana 67' (pen.)	Report	72' Yankos	Attendance: 45,000

9 April 1990 FIFA World Cup qualification	New Zealand	2–2	Israel	Mount Smart Stadium, Auckland
	Wright 19'; Dunford 35'	Report	16' Rosenthal; 37' Klinger	Attendance: 3,200

16 April 1990 FIFA World Cup qualification	Australia	1–1	Israel	Sydney Football Stadium, Sydney
	Trimboli 88'	Report	40' Ohana	Attendance: 40,320

15 October 1990 FIFA World Cup qualification	Colombia	1–0	Israel	Estadio Metropolitano Roberto Meléndez, Barranquilla
	Usuriaga 73'	Report		Attendance: 65,000

30 October 1990 FIFA World Cup qualification	Israel	0–0	Colombia	Ramat Gan Stadium, Ramat Gan
		Report		Attendance: 50,000

== See also ==
- Israel national football team results (2020–present)
- Israel national football team results (1990–2019)
- Israel national football team results (1934–1959)
