= List of Israel international footballers =

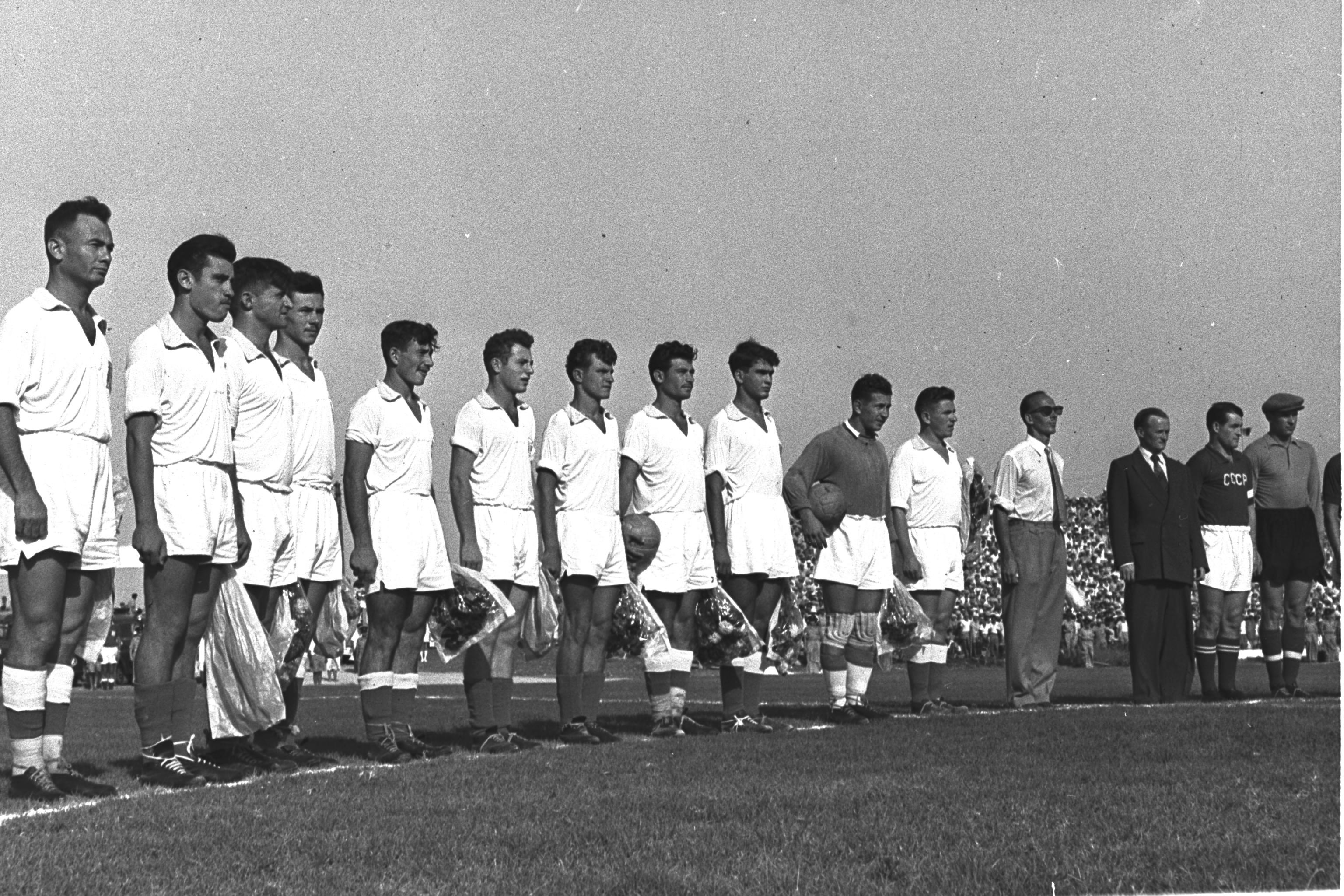
Israel (in white) line up ahead of a friendly match against the Soviet Union in 1956

The Israel national football team has represented Israel in international association football since 1934, when it played its first official game (as Mandatory Palestine or Eretz Israel—"Land of Israel") against Egypt. It is fielded by the Israel Football Association (IFA), which has governed football in the country since 1928, and has borne its present name since the foundation of the State of Israel in 1948. Israel competed as a member of the Asian Football Confederation from 1956 until 1974, when it was expelled for political reasons; it then played without formal affiliation to any regional bloc for two decades. In 1994 the IFA was made a full member of the Union of European Football Associations (UEFA), enabling the inclusion of Israeli teams in UEFA competitions.

Since 1934, more than 491 players have appeared for the Israel national team; those 111 with 20 or more caps are listed here. The Israel national team's only major honour is the AFC Asian Cup, which it hosted and won in 1964. It has qualified for the FIFA World Cup final tournament once, in 1970, and for the Summer Olympic Games twice, in 1968 and in 1976.

Israel's all-time top goalscorer is Mordechai Spiegler, who scored 33 international goals in 83 matches between 1963 and 1977. Yossi Benayoun, a midfielder, holds the record for the most national team appearances, having played for Israel 99 times between 1998 and 2017. The team's highest-capped goalkeeper, Dudu Aouate, represented Israel 78 times between 1999 and 2013. The most-capped player of non-Jewish background is Bibras Natcho, who appeared for the Israeli squad 88 times between 2010 and 2023, scoring 4 goals.

== Players ==
Appearances and goals are composed of FIFA World Cup, Summer Olympic Games, AFC Asian Cup, and UEFA European Championship matches and each competition's required qualification matches, as well as numerous international friendly tournaments and matches. The statistics given here include some matches recognised as official by the Israel Football Association (IFA), but not by FIFA; the tallies maintained by FIFA for a given player may be slightly lower than the IFA's. The years given in the column marked "national team career" are those of each player's first and last international cap. Players are initially listed by number of caps, then number of goals scored. Where two or more players have the same number of caps and goals scored, they are initially listed alphabetically. Statistics are correct as of the match played on 9 September 2021.

Key
| ^{†} | Still eligible for the national team (Note: Players marked as "still eligible for the national team" are those who have not retired from international football and who are, therefore, still selectable.) |
| ^{‡} | Played on the team that won the 1964 AFC Asian Cup |
| GK | Goalkeeper |
| DF | Defender |
| MF | Midfielder |
| FW | Forward |

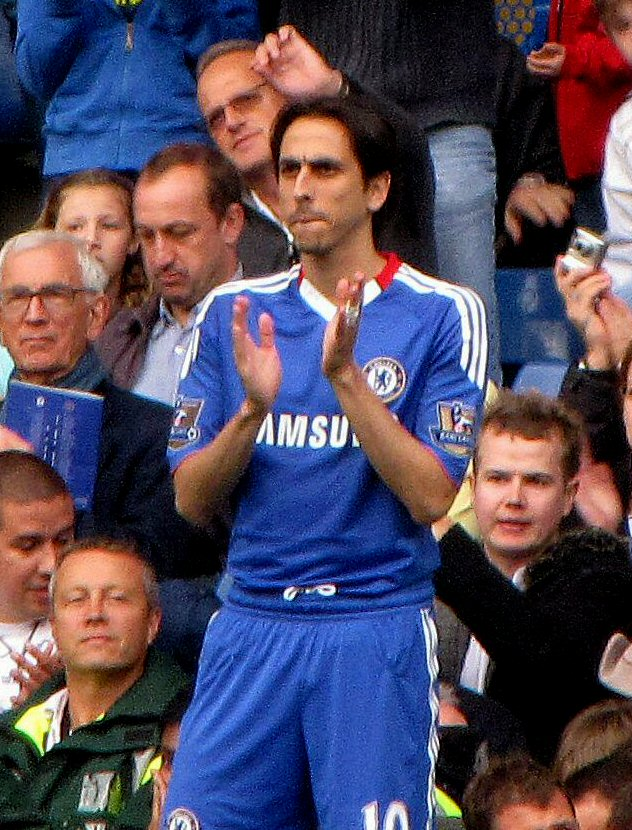
Yossi Benayoun is the most-capped Israel international, having appeared in 100 matches, while scoring 24 goals.

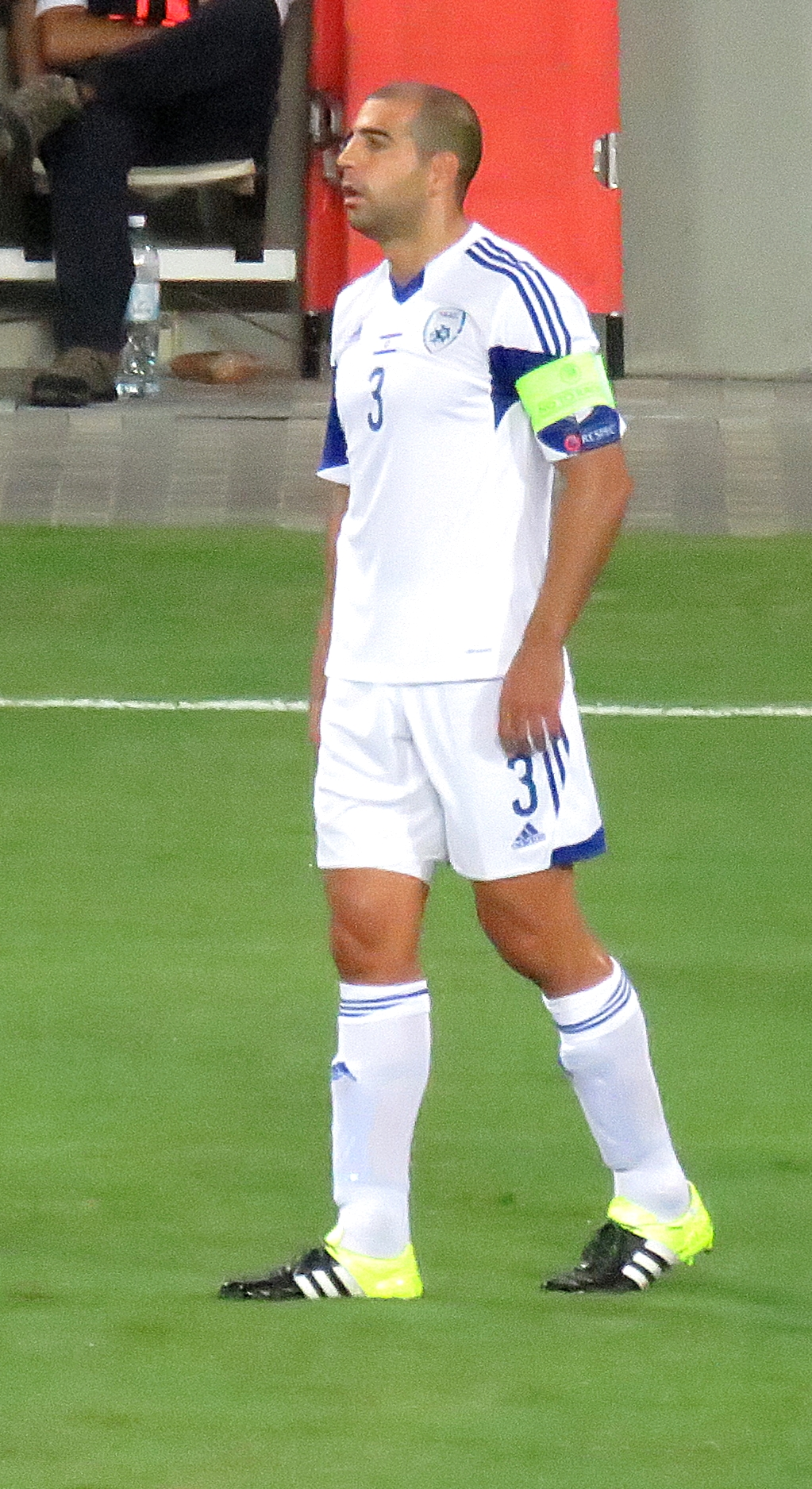
Tal Ben Haim has so far played for Israel 94 times, scoring once.

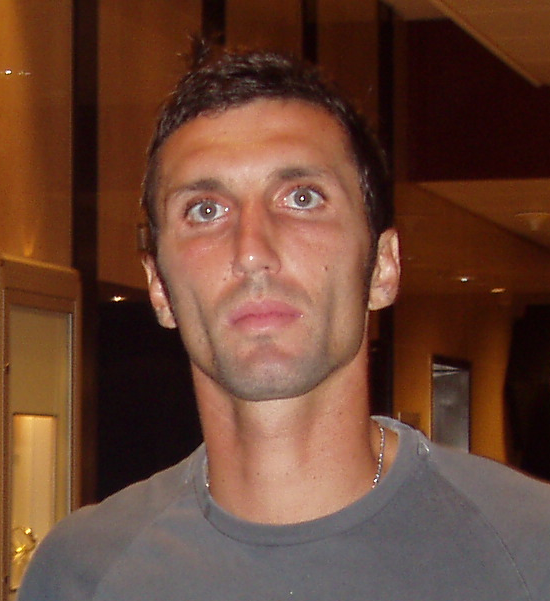
Arik Benado is the third most-capped Israel international, having appeared in 94 matches.

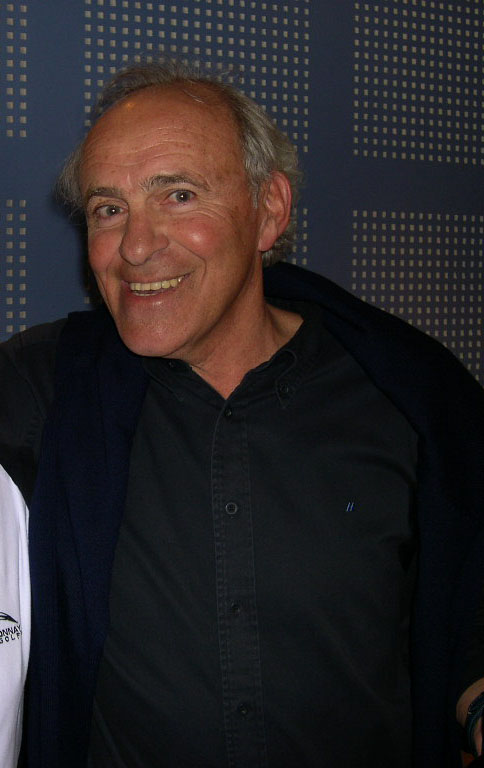
Mordechai Spiegler is the all-time leading goalscorer, with 33 goals in 83 games.

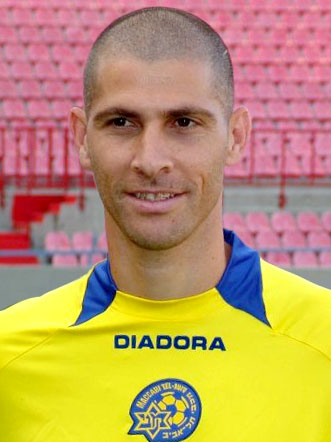
Avi Nimni scored 17 goals in 80 international games.

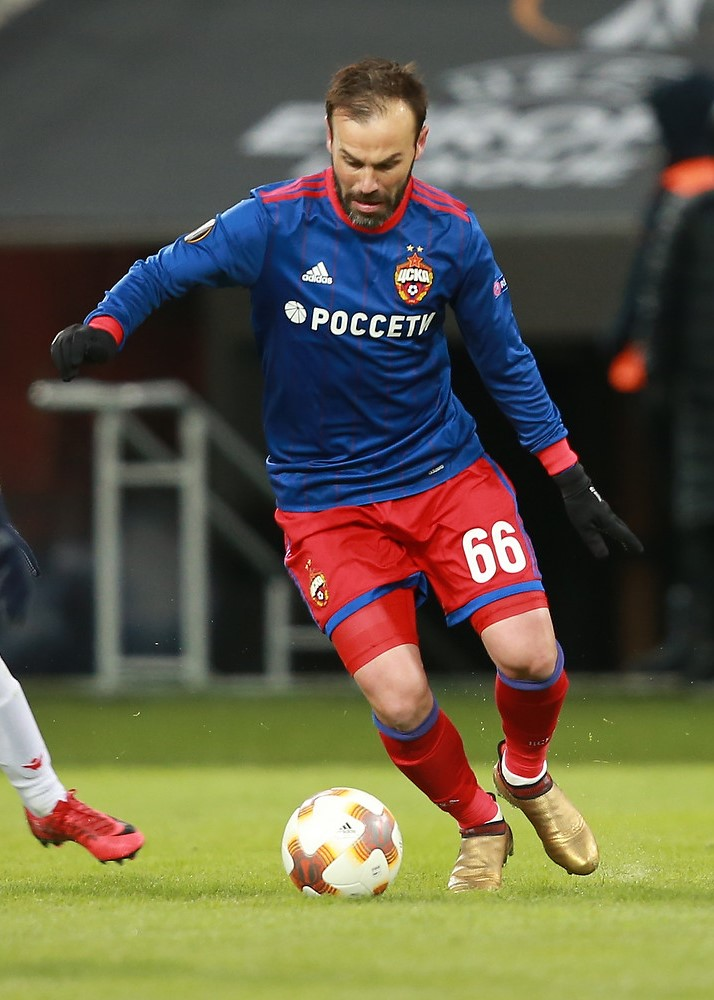
The most-capped player of non-Jewish background is Bibras Natcho, who appeared for the Israeli squad 88 times between 2010 and 2023, scoring 4 goals.

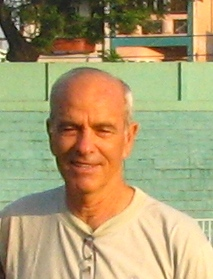
Itzhak Vissoker is a goalkeeper with 69 international caps.

Israel national team footballers with at least 20 appearances
| # | Name | Position | National team career | Caps | Goals | Ref |
|---|---|---|---|---|---|---|
| 1 | Yossi Benayoun | MF | 1998–2017 | 102 | 24 | |
| 2 | Tal Ben Haim | DF | 2002–2017 | 96 | 1 | |
| 3 | Arik Benado | DF | 1995–2007 | 94 | 0 | |
| 4 | Alon Harazi | DF | 1992–2006 | 89 | 2 | |
| 5 | Bibras Natcho | MF | 2010–2023 | 88 | 4 | |
| 6 | Amir Schelach | DF | 1992–2001 | 85 | 0 | |
| 7 | Mordechai Spiegler^{‡} | FW | 1963–1977 | 83 | 33 | |
| 8 | Nir Klinger | MF | 1987–1997 | 83 | 2 | |
| 9 | Avi Nimni | MF | 1992–2005 | 80 | 17 | |
| 10 | Tal Banin | MF | 1990–2003 | 78 | 12 | |
| 11 | Itzhak Shum | MF | 1969–1981 | 78 | 10 | |
| 12 | Eyal Berkovic | MF | 1992–2004 | 78 | 9 | |
| 13 | Dudu Aouate | GK | 1999–2013 | 78 | 0 | |
| 14 | Walid Badir | DF | 1997–2007 | 74 | 12 | |
| 15 | Eran Zahavi^{†} | FW | 2010–present | 72 | 35 | |
| 16 | Alon Hazan | MF | 1990–2000 | 72 | 5 | |
| 17 | Gidi Damti | FW | 1971–1981 | 69 | 21 | |
| 18 | Idan Tal | MF | 1998–2007 | 69 | 5 | |
| 19 | Itzhak Vissoker^{‡} | GK | 1963–1976 | 69 | 0 | |
| 20 | Bonni Ginzburg | GK | 1984–1996 | 68 | 0 | |
| 21 | Haim Revivo | MF | 1992–2003 | 67 | 15 | |
| 22 | Avi Cohen | DF | 1976–1988 | 64 | 1 | |
| 23 | Uri Malmilian | MF | 1975–1990 | 62 | 16 | |
| 24 | Nahum Stelmach^{‡} | FW | 1956–1968 | 61 | 22 | |
| 25 | Ronny Rosenthal | FW | 1984–1997 | 60 | 11 | |
| 26 | Eli Dasa^{†} | DF | 2015–present | 60 | 0 | |
| 27 | Zvi Rosen | DF | 1968–1975 | 58 | 5 | |
| 28 | Eitan Tibi^{†} | DF | 2012–2021 | 57 | 1 | |
| 29 | Menachem Bello | DF | 1965–1975 | 57 | 0 | |
| 30 | Adoram Keisi | DF | 1994–2006 | 54 | 4 | |
| 31 | Ronen Harazi | FW | 1992–1999 | 53 | 23 | |
| 32 | Eli Ohana | FW | 1984–1997 | 51 | 17 | |
| 33 | Haim Bar | DF | 1974–1983 | 51 | 1 | |
| 34 | Nir Davidovich | GK | 1998–2010 | 51 | 0 | |
| 35 | Yehoshua Feigenbaum | FW | 1966–1977 | 50 | 24 | |
| 36 | Roby Young^{‡} | MF | 1961–1969 | 50 | 8 | |
| 37 | Shimon Gershon | DF | 1999–2008 | 50 | 4 | |
| 38 | Moshe Sinai | MF | 1981–1990 | 47 | 7 | |
| 39 | Beram Kayal | MF | 2008–2019 | 46 | 2 | |
| 40 | Rachamim Talbi | FW | 1965–1973 | 45 | 10 | |
| 41 | Giora Spiegel | MF | 1965–1980 | 44 | 18 | |
| 42 | Ben Sahar^{†} | FW | 2007–2019 | 44 | 8 | |
| 43 | Shmuel Rosenthal | MF | 1965–1973 | 43 | 2 | |
| 44 | Rafi Cohen | GK | 1992–2000 | 43 | 0 | |
| 45 | Amatzia Levkovich^{‡} | DF | 1957–1965 | 42 | 1 | |
| 46 | Lior Refaelov | MF | 2007–2017 | 40 | 6 | |
| 47 | Moanes Dabour | FW | 2014–2022 | 40 | 15 | |
| 48 | Vicky Peretz | FW | 1973–1983 | 40 | 14 | |
| 49 | Nir Bitton^{†} | MF | 2010–2022 | 39 | 2 | |
| 50 | Ofir Marciano^{†} | DF | 2014–2022 | 40 | 0 | |
| 51 | Felix Halfon | DF | 1992–1998 | 38 | 0 | |
| 52 | David Primo^{‡} | DF | 1964–1976 | 38 | 0 | |
| 53 | Tomer Hemed^{†} | DF | 2011–2018 | 38 | 18 | |
| 54 | Elyaniv Barda^{†} | FW | 2007–2016 | 38 | 12 | |
| 55 | Alon Mizrahi | FW | 1992–2001 | 37 | 16 | |
| 56 | Omer Golan | FW | 2004–2010 | 37 | 8 | |
| 57 | Dor Peretz^{†} | MF | 2015–present | 38 | 6 | |
| 58 | George Borba | MF | 1966–1973 | 37 | 7 | |
| 59 | Yisha'ayahu Schwager | DF | 1966–1974 | 37 | 0 | |
| 60 | Gal Alberman | MF | 2002–2013 | 36 | 1 | |
| 61 | Gideon Tish^{‡} | MF | 1958–1964 | 36 | 1 | |
| 62 | Yehoshua Glazer | FW | 1949–1961 | 35 | 18 | |
| 63 | Yossi Abukasis | MF | 1996–2003 | 35 | 3 | |
| 64 | Shraga Bar | FW | 1968–1972 | 34 | 1 | |
| 65 | Ran Ben Shimon | MF | 1992–1999 | 34 | 0 | |
| 66 | Reuven Atar | MF | 1989–1997 | 33 | 3 | |
| 67 | Rifaat Turk | MF | 1976–1986 | 33 | 3 | |
| 68 | Avi Cohen | DF | 1987–1992 | 32 | 5 | |
| 69 | Efraim Davidi | DF | 1983–1990 | 32 | 0 | |
| 70 | Yoav Ziv | DF | 2006–2012 | 32 | 0 | |
| 71 | Sheran Yeini | MF | 2013–2020 | 32 | 0 | |
| 72 | Itzik Zohar | MF | 1992–2000 | 31 | 9 | |
| 73 | Yaniv Katan | FW | 2000–2009 | 31 | 5 | |
| 74 | David Amsalem | DF | 1992–1999 | 31 | 0 | |
| 75 | Ya'akov Hodorov | GK | 1949–1964 | 31 | 0 | |
| 76 | Avraham Menchel | MF | 1959–1963 | 30 | 7 | |
| 77 | Moshe Glam | DF | 1993–1997 | 30 | 2 | |
| 78 | David Pizanti | DF | 1983–1989 | 30 | 0 | |
| 79 | Pini Balili | FW | 2000–2007 | 29 | 7 | |
| 80 | Ya'akov Ekhoiz | DF | 1980–1986 | 29 | 0 | |
| 81 | Danny Shmulevich-Rom | FW | 1960–1970 | 29 | 0 | |
| 82 | Zahi Armeli | FW | 1983–1986 | 28 | 10 | |
| 83 | Tal Ben Haim^{†} | FW | 2011–2018 | 28 | 5 | |
| 84 | Dedi Ben Dayan | DF | 2000–2012 | 28 | 1 | |
| 85 | Gili Vermouth | MF | 2009–2015 | 28 | 2 | |
| 86 | Itay Shechter^{†} | FW | 2009–2017 | 27 | 5 | |
| 87 | Omri Afek | MF | 2002–2006 | 27 | 5 | |
| 88 | Eli Driks | FW | 1987–1996 | 27 | 4 | |
| 89 | Dekel Keinan^{†} | DF | 2007–2013 | 27 | 0 | |
| 90 | Yuval Spungin | DF | 2007–2014 | 27 | 0 | |
| 91 | Yaron Oz | MF | 1973–1977 | 26 | 2 | |
| 92 | Moshe Leon^{‡} | DF | 1962–1977 | 26 | 1 | |
| 93 | Rami Gershon^{†} | DF | 2010–2017 | 26 | 2 | |
| 94 | Maor Melikson | MF | 2010–2018 | 25 | 3 | |
| 95 | Yosef Goldstein | MF | 1953–1961 | 25 | 1 | |
| 96 | Eli Leventhal | MF | 1974–1977 | 25 | 1 | |
| 97 | Klemi Saban | DF | 2004–2010 | 25 | 1 | |
| 98 | Yehuda Amar | DF | 1987–1993 | 25 | 0 | |
| 99 | Arie Haviv | GK | 1978–1985 | 25 | 0 | |
| 100 | Gadi Brumer | DF | 1993–2002 | 24 | 2 | |
| 101 | Shlomo Kirat | DF | 1978–1985 | 24 | 0 | |
| 102 | Meir Nimni | DF | 1974–1977 | 24 | 0 | |
| 103 | Moshe Schweitzer | MF | 1974–1977 | 23 | 8 | |
| 104 | Shalom Tikva | FW | 1986–1994 | 23 | 6 | |
| 105 | Maor Buzaglo | MF | 2007–2016 | 23 | 1 | |
| 106 | Ofer Talker | DF | 1997–2001 | 23 | 1 | |
| 107 | Haim Levin^{‡} | GK | 1963–1969 | 22 | 0 | |
| 108 | Roberto Colautti | FW | 2006–2010 | 21 | 6 | |
| 109 | Jan Talesnikov | MF | 1998–2000 | 21 | 4 | |
| 110 | Gad Machnes | DF | 1978–1985 | 21 | 1 | |
| 111 | Tamir Cohen | MF | 2007–2011 | 21 | 0 | |
| 112 | Omer Damari | FW | 2010–2016 | 20 | 9 | |
| 113 | Michael Zandberg | MF | 2002–2007 | 20 | 4 | |
| 114 | Eli Cohen | MF | 1983–1989 | 20 | 3 | |
| 115 | Nir Alon | DF | 1988–1989 | 20 | 1 | |
| 116 | Yaron Parselani | DF | 1983–1989 | 20 | 0 | |

== Notes and references ==
Notes
