= Football at the 1974 Asian Games =

- Venue: Aryamehr Stadium; Amjadieh Stadium; Persepolis Stadium
- Date: 2–15 September 1974
- Nations: 15

Medalists
gold medal	Iran
silver medal	Israel
bronze medal	Malaysia

Football was contested as part of the programme for the 1974 Asian Games which was hosted in Tehran, Iran from 1 to 16 September 1974. It was the seventh edition of the men's football tournament at the multi-sport event organised by the Asian Games Federation.

The football tournament began with the first matches of the first group stage on 2 September 1974 and ended with the gold medal match on 15 September 1974. Iran and Israel contested the final. Iran defeated Israel 1–0 to win the gold medal. In the bronze medal match, Malaysia defeated North Korea 2–1.

== Background ==
Football had been part of the Asian Games programme following the debut of the men's competition at the inaugural 1951 Asian Games in India.

Burma, India and Taiwan held the record for gold medals having each won the football tournament twice. Burma and South Korea were both defending champions after sharing the gold medal following a goalless draw after extra time in the final at the 1970 Asian Games in Thailand.

== Format ==
In total, 15 teams took part in the competition. They were drawn into four single round robin groups – three of four teams and one of three teams. The group winners and runners-up were then drawn into two single round robin groups of four teams. The winners of the second group stage would contest the gold medal match and the runners-up would contest the bronze medal match.

=== Participants ===
- Bahrain
- Burma
- China
- Japan
- India
- Iran
- Iraq
- Israel
- Kuwait
- Malaysia
- North Korea
- Pakistan
- Philippines
- South Korea
- Thailand

== Venues ==
Matches were played at three venues in Tehran including the Aryamehr Stadium, the Amjadieh Stadium and the Persepolis Stadium.

Tehran
Aryamehr Stadium	Amjadieh Stadium	Persepolis Stadium
Capacity: 100,000	Capacity: 25,000	Capacity: 12,000

== First group stage ==
=== Group A ===
Kuwait and South Korea advanced to the second group stage.

==== Table ====
Pos	Team	Pld	W	D	L	GF	GA	GD	Pts	
1	Kuwait	2	2	0	0	7	2	+5	4	Qualification for the second group stage
2	South Korea	2	1	0	1	1	4	−3	2	Qualification for the second group stage
3	Thailand	2	0	0	2	2	4	−2	0	

==== Matches ====
2 September 1974

Kuwait	3–2	Thailand
Kamel (x2); Al-Dakhil		Unknown (x2)

Persepolis Stadium, Tehran

4 September 1974

South Korea	1–0	Thailand
Ko Jae-wook 41'

Amjadieh Stadium, Tehran
Referee: Eitan (Israel)

6 September 1974

South Korea	0–4	Kuwait
		Kamel 6', 25'; Yaqoub 40', 90'

Aryamehr Stadium, Tehran

=== Group B ===
Iraq and North Korea advanced to the second group stage.

==== Table ====
Pos	Team	Pld	W	D	L	GF	GA	GD	Pts	
1	Iraq	3	3	0	0	5	0	+5	6	Qualification for the second group stage
2	North Korea	3	2	0	1	6	2	+4	4	Qualification for the second group stage
3	China	3	1	0	2	7	4	+3	2	
4	India	3	0	0	3	2	14	−12	0	

==== Matches ====
2 September 1974

India	0–3	Iraq
		Jassam 19'; Hassan 27'; Kadhim 58'

Amjadieh Stadium, Tehran
2 September 1974

North Korea	2–0	China
An Se-uk 34'; An Gil-wan 61'

Aryamehr Stadium, Tehran

4 September 1974

China	7–1	India
Wang Jilian 4', 25'; Li Guoning 10' (pen.), 58'; Liu Qingquan 50'; Rong Zhixing 76'; Chi Shangbin 82'		Rajvi 74'

Aryamehr Stadium, Tehran
4 September 1974

North Korea	0–1	Iraq
		Jassam 73'

Amjadieh Stadium, Tehran

6 September 1974

China	0–1	Iraq
		Hatim 24'

Aryamehr Stadium, Tehran
6 September 1974

India	1–4	North Korea
Rajvi		Hong Song-nam (x2); Yang Song-guk; Myong Dong-chan

Amjadieh Stadium, Tehran

=== Group C ===
Israel and Malaysia advanced to the second group stage.

==== Table ====
Pos	Team	Pld	W	D	L	GF	GA	GD	Pts	
1	Israel	3	3	0	0	17	3	+14	6	Qualification for the second group stage
2	Malaysia	3	1	1	1	15	9	+6	3	Qualification for the second group stage
3	Japan	3	1	1	1	5	4	+1	3	
4	Philippines	3	0	0	3	0	21	−21	0	

==== Matches ====
3 September 1974

Japan	4–0	Philippines
Kamamoto 1', 15', 44'; Watanabe 76'

Amjadieh Stadium, Tehran
3 September 1974

Israel	8–3	Malaysia
Onana 4', 17'; Schwarz 10'; Feigenbaum 39'; Damti 47', 68', 90'; Massuari 76'		Zawawi 59' (pen.); Syed Ahmad 74', 82'

Aryamehr Stadium, Tehran

5 September 1974

Israel	6–0	Philippines
Schweitzer 16', 42'; Damti 24'; Shum 31'; Onana 41'; Feigenbaum 90'

Aryamehr Stadium, Tehran
5 September 1974

Japan	1–1	Malaysia
Yoshimura 67'		Mohammed Bakar 66'

Persepolis Stadium, Tehran

7 September 1974

Malaysia	11–0	Philippines
Mokhtar (x5); Syed Ahmad (x2); Isa Bakar (x2); Harun (x2)

Persepolis Stadium, Tehran
7 September 1974

Japan	0–3	Israel
		Feigenbaum 55', 63'; Damti 86'

Aryamehr Stadium, Tehran

=== Group D ===
Iran and Burma advanced to the second group stage.

==== Table ====
Pos	Team	Pld	W	D	L	GF	GA	GD	Pts	
1	Iran	3	3	0	0	15	1	+14	6	Qualification for the second group stage
2	Burma	3	2	0	1	10	3	+7	4	Qualification for the second group stage
3	Pakistan	3	1	0	2	6	13	−7	2	
4	Bahrain	3	0	0	3	1	15	−14	0	

==== Matches ====
3 September 1974

Iran	7–0	Pakistan
Mazloumi 4', 44', 68'; Jabbari 11'; Parvin 28', 55'; Ghelichkhani 80'

Amjadieh Stadium, Tehran
3 September 1974

Burma	4–0	Bahrain
Yousif 20' (o.g.); Ye Nyunt 54', 62'; Tin Wein 75'

Persepolis Stadium, Tehran

5 September 1974

Pakistan	5–1	Bahrain
Nawaz (x2); Sarwar (x2); Idrees		Bushager

Amjadieh Stadium, Tehran
5 September 1974

Iran	2–1	Burma
Sadeghi 7'; Janmaleki 57'		Mya Kyaing 37'

Aryamehr Stadium, Tehran

7 September 1974

Burma	5–1	Pakistan
Than Soe (x2); Mya Kyaing (x2); Ye Nyunt		Idrees

Aryamehr Stadium, Tehran
7 September 1974

Iran	6–0	Bahrain
Jahani 25'; Al-Durazi 28' (o.g.); Ghelichkhani 32'; Etemadi 41'; Dastjerdi 46'; Haghverdian 73'

Amjadieh Stadium, Tehran

== Second group stage ==
=== Group A ===
Iran advanced to the gold medal match and Malaysia advanced to the bronze medal match.

==== Table ====
Pos	Team	Pld	W	D	L	GF	GA	GD	Pts	
1	Iran	3	3	0	0	4	0	+4	6	Qualification for the gold medal match
2	Malaysia	3	1	1	1	3	3	0	3	Qualification for the bronze medal match
3	Iraq	3	0	2	1	1	2	−1	2	
4	South Korea	3	0	1	2	3	6	−3	1	

==== Matches ====
9 September 1974

Iran	1–0	Malaysia
Parvin 17'

Aryamehr Stadium, Tehran
9 September 1974

Iraq	1–1	South Korea
Jassam 74'		Park Byung-chul 48'

Aryamehr Stadium, Tehran

11 September 1974

Iran	2–0	South Korea
Mazloumi 74', 86'

Aryamehr Stadium, Tehran
11 September 1974

Malaysia	0–0	Iraq

Aryamehr Stadium, Tehran

13 September 1974

Iran	1–0	Iraq
Roshan 76'

Aryamehr Stadium, Tehran
13 September 1974

South Korea	2–3	Malaysia
Lee Hoi-taek 12'; Park Lee-chun 81'		Harun 10', 22'; Ali Bakar 78'

Aryamehr Stadium, Tehran

=== Group B ===
Kuwait and North Korea declined to play against Israel so both games were awarded as technical 2–0 wins for Israel. As a result, Israel advanced to the gold medal match after only playing one match and North Korea advanced to the bronze medal match.

==== Table ====
Pos	Team	Pld	W	D	L	GF	GA	GD	Pts	
1	Israel	3	3	0	0	7	0	+7	6	Qualification for the gold medal match
2	North Korea	3	1	1	1	4	4	0	3	Qualification for the bronze medal match
3	Kuwait	3	1	0	2	5	6	−1	2	
4	Burma	3	0	1	2	4	10	−6	1	

==== Matches ====
10 September 1974

Kuwait	0–2	North Korea
		Cha Jung-sok 11'; Pak Jong-hun 46'

Aryamehr Stadium, Tehran
10 September 1974

Israel	3–0	Burma
Feigenbaum 31'; Schweitzer 49'; Damti 89'

Aryamehr Stadium, Tehran

12 September 1974

Kuwait	5–2	Burma
Yaqoub (x2); Kameel; Hussein Mohammed; Ali Mullah		Mya Kyaing; Tin Sein

Aryamehr Stadium, Tehran
12 September 1974

Israel	2–0 Awarded	North Korea

Aryamehr Stadium, Tehran

14 September 1974

North Korea	2–2	Burma
Yang Song-guk 41'; Kim Jong-min 42'		Maung Maung Tin 20' (pen.); Tin Aung 68'

Aryamehr Stadium, Tehran
14 September 1974

Israel	2–0 Awarded	Kuwait

Aryamehr Stadium, Tehran

== Bronze medal match ==
Malaysia defeated North Korea to win the bronze medal.

15 September 1974

North Korea	1–2	Malaysia
Kim Jong-min 58'		Isa Bakar 48', 81'

Aryamehr Stadium, Tehran

== Gold medal match ==
Iran defeated Israel to win the gold medal.

15 September 1974
20:00

Israel	0–1	Iran
		Shum 29' (o.g.)

Aryamehr Stadium, Tehran
Attendance: 100,000
Referee: Mohammed Azam (India)
