= Israeli Football Hall of Fame =

Professional sports hall of fame

The Israeli Football Hall of Fame is Hall of Fame for the best association football players in the history of the Israeli football, initiated by sports channel in cooperation with the Israeli Football Players Association in Israel, Financed by the Israeli Sports Betting Council. A special panel of media covering the football industry in Israel formed in March and April 2009 and selected fifty players to be added to the Hall of Fame, from an initial list of a hundred candidates. Names of the players entered the Hall of Fame a month later. Danny Inbar was the program presenter.

Among the special committee members there were members of sports men, sport broadcasters, sports writers and culture officials, including: Guy Cohen, Jeremy Weitz, Moti Kirschenbaum, Yoram Arbel, Gavri Levi, Avi Meller, Shlomi Barzel, Dani Dvorin, Amir Efrat, Zuhir Bahlul, and more.

The fifty members of the Hall of Fame chose Mordechai Spiegler, Eyal Berkovic, Haim Revivo, Eli Ohana and Uri Malmilian as the best five Israeli football players in the Israeli football history. Also, they selected Mordechai Spiegler as the greatest football player in Israel, and Eli Ohana goal in the match against Australia in the 1990 FIFA World Cup qualification was selected as the most important goal of all time. In addition, the Israeli national team's game against Sweden in the 1970 FIFA World Cup was elected the best game in history, while Emmanuel Scheffer who managed the national team won the World Cup Lifetime Achievement Award.

== Inductees ==
The following list includes the footballers who were named in the Hall of Fame:

- Yossi Abukasis
- Eli Ohana
- Motti Ivanir
- Zahi Armeli
- Ehud Ben Tuvim
- Eli Ben Rimoz
- Tal Banin
- Haim Bar
- Meir Barad
- Eyal Berkovic
- Bonni Ginzburg
- Yehoshua Glazer
- Gidi Damti

- Eli Driks
- Yochanan Vollach
- Itzhak Vissoker
- Itzik Zohar
- Ya'akov Hodorov
- Alon Hazan
- Benny Tabak
- Rifaat Turk
- Avi Cohen
- Amatsia Levkovich
- Haim Levin
- Moshe Leon
- Alon Mizrahi

- Yossi Mizrahi
- Oded Machnes
- Uri Malmilian
- Avi Nimni
- Nahum Stelmach
- Moshe Sinai
- Reuven Atar
- Eli Fuchs
- David Pizanti
- Yehoshua Feigenbaum
- David Primo
- Vicky Peretz
- Nir Klinger

- Haim Revivo
- Zvi Rosen
- Ronny Rosenthal
- Moshe Romano
- Avi Ran
- Zharia Ratzabi
- Yisha'ayahu Schwager
- Itzhak Shum
- Giora Spiegel
- Mordechai Spiegler
- Shalom Tikva
