= 1969 Israel Super Cup =

Hapoel Tel Aviv	Hakoah Ramat Gan
5	1
- Date: 17 September 1969
- Venue: Bloomfield Stadium, Tel Aviv
- Referee: Aharon Shoshani
- Attendance: 6,000

The 1969 Israel Super Cup was the sixth Israel Super Cup, an annual Israeli football match played between the winners of the previous season's Top Division and Israel State Cup, and the first time the competition was played under the IFA.

The match was played between Hapoel Tel Aviv, champions of the 1968–69 Liga Leumit and Hakoah Ramat Gan, winners of the 1968–69 Israel State Cup. At the match, played at Bloomfield Stadium, Hapoel Tel Aviv won 5–1.

== Match details ==
17 September 1969

Hapoel Tel Aviv	5–1	Hakoah Ramat Gan
Feigenbaum 6', 26', 56'; Mordechovich 80'; Borba 88'		Shauli 47'

Bloomfield Stadium, Tel Aviv
Attendance: 6,000
Referee: Aharon Shoshani

Hapoel Tel Aviv	Hakoah Ramat Gan

GK	(Israel) Avraham Binyamin
DF	(Israel) Shimon Ben Yehonatan (c)
DF	(Israel) Nahman Castro
DF	(Israel) David Primo
RM	(Israel) Moshe Mordechovich
CM	(Israel) Yehezkel Chazom
CM	(Israel) Roni Kaldaron
LM	(Israel) Ya'akov Rahminovich
FW	(Israel) Yehoshua Feigenbaum
FW	(Israel) A. Cohen
FW	(Israel) George Borba
Substitutes:
MF	(Israel) Brener	Substituted on
Manager:
(Israel) Rehavia Rosenbaum

GK	(Israel) Michael Kadosh
RB	(Israel) Itzhak Sustiel
DF	(Israel) Efraim Gabai
DF	(Israel) Aharon Shuruk
LB	(Israel) Danny Heftel
CM	(Israel) Danny Nahmias
CM	(Israel) Sammy Shauli
CM	(Israel) Ephraim Pittel
FW	(Israel) Zvi Farkas
FW	(Israel) Gadi Zelniker
FW	(Israel) Bardugo
Substitutes:
MF	(Israel) Hasdai	Substituted on
FW	(Israel) Haim Tsabari	Substituted on
Manager:
(Israel) Eliezer Spiegel
