= An Gil-wan =

North Korean footballer (born 1948)

Personal information
- Date of birth: 8 August 1948 (age 78)
- Place of birth: North Korea
- Height: 1.74 m (5 ft 9 in)
- Position: Defender

International career
Years	Team	Apps	(Gls)
1973–1976	North Korea	5+	(1+)

- An Gil-wan
- Hangul: 안길환
- RR: An Gilhwan
- MR: An Kirhwan

An Gil-wan (Korean: 안길환; born 8 August 1948) is a North Korean former footballer who played as a defender.

== Career ==
An was called up for the North Korea national team in 1973, for a 3–0 win against Syria during 1974 FIFA World Cup qualification. The following year, he competed for North Korea at the 1974 Asian Games in Tehran, where he scored in a 2–0 win against China. He later played in the bronze medal match, where they lost 2–1 to Malaysia.

In 1976, he was called up to North Korea's squad for the 1976 Summer Olympics. He played in both of their group stage matches, a 3–1 win against Canada and a 3–0 defeat to the Soviet Union, where he was sent off for arguing with Spanish referee Emilio Guruceta Muro over whether one of his teammates committed a handball, before striking the referee three times.

On 29 July 1976, despite video evidence from the match being erased, he was suspended by FIFA for a year, with three others banned for three months, including two North Korean officials and teammate An Se-uk, who was suspended for kicking an opponent during North Korea's 5–0 defeat to Poland.
