= Israel national football team results (2020–present) =

This article provides details of international football games played by the Israel national football team from 2020 to present.

== Results ==
=== 2020 ===
7 June Friendly	Ukraine	Cancelled	Israel	Lviv, Ukraine
		Report		Stadium: Arena Lviv
Note: The friendly match was cancelled due to the worldwide COVID-19 pandemic.

4 September 2020–21 UEFA Nations League	Scotland	1–1	Israel	Glasgow, Scotland
20:45 (19:45 UTC+1)	Christie 45' (pen.)	Report (UEFA)	Zahavi 73'	Stadium: Hampden Park; Attendance: 0 (Note: The match was played behind closed doors due to the worldwide COVID-19 pandemic.); Referee: Slavko Vinčić (Slovenia)

7 September 2020–21 UEFA Nations League	Israel	1–1	Slovakia	Netanya, Israel
20:45 (21:45 UTC+3)	Elmkies 90+1'	Report (UEFA)	Ďuriš 14'	Stadium: Netanya Stadium; Attendance: 0 Referee: Nikola Dabanović (Montenegro)

8 October UEFA Euro 2020 qualifying play-offs	Scotland	0–0 (a.e.t.) (5–3 p)	Israel	Glasgow, Scotland
21:45 (19:45 UTC±0)		Report (UEFA)		Stadium: Hampden Park; Attendance: 0 Referee: Ovidiu Hațegan (Romania)
	Penalties
	McGinn (penalty scored); McGregor (penalty scored); McTominay (penalty scored); Shankland (penalty scored); McLean (penalty scored)		(penalty missed) Zahavi; (penalty scored) Bitton; (penalty scored) Weissman; (penalty scored) Abu Fani

11 October 2020–21 UEFA Nations League	Israel	1–2	Czech Republic	Haifa, Israel
20:45 (21:45 UTC+3)	Zahavi 56'	Report (UEFA)	Abu Hanna 14' (o.g.); Vydra 48'	Stadium: Sammy Ofer Stadium; Attendance: 0 Referee: Tiago Martins (Portugal)

14 October 2020–21 UEFA Nations League	Slovakia	2–3	Israel	Trnava, Slovakia
20:45 (21:45 UTC+3)	Hamšík 16'; Mak 38'	Report (UEFA)	Zahavi 68', 76', 89'	Stadium: Anton Malatinský Stadium; Attendance: 0 Referee: Alejandro Hernández Hernández (Spain)

11 November Friendly	Norway	Cancelled	Israel	Oslo, Norway
		Report		Stadium: Ullevaal Stadion
Note: The friendly match was canceled due to the worldwide COVID-19 pandemic.

15 November 2020–21 UEFA Nations League	Czech Republic	1–0	Israel	Plzeň, Czech Republic
20:45	Darida 7'	Report (UEFA)		Stadium: Doosan Arena; Attendance: 0 Referee: Srđan Jovanović (Serbia)

18 November 2020–21 UEFA Nations League	Israel	1–0	Scotland	Netanya, Israel
20:45	Solomon 44'	Report (UEFA)		Stadium: Netanya Stadium; Attendance: 0 Referee: Paweł Raczkowski (Poland)

=== 2021 ===
25 March 2022 FIFA World Cup qualification	Israel	0–2	Denmark	Tel Aviv, Israel
19:00		Report (FIFA); Report (UEFA)	Braithwaite 13'; Wind 67'	Stadium: Bloomfield Stadium; Attendance: 5,000 (Note: The Israeli authorities have allowed the attendance of audiences at football matches (up to 5,000 seats), thanks to over 50% of Israel's population who have been fully vaccinated for COVID-19 by then.); Referee: Craig Pawson (England)

28 March 2022 FIFA World Cup qualification	Israel	1–1	Scotland	Tel Aviv, Israel
21:45	Peretz 44'	Report (FIFA); Report (UEFA)	Fraser 56'	Stadium: Bloomfield Stadium; Attendance: 5,000; Referee: Deniz Aytekin (Germany)

31 March 2022 FIFA World Cup qualification	Moldova	1–4	Israel	Chișinău, Moldova
21:45	Carp 29'	Report (FIFA); Report (UEFA)	Zahavi 45+2'; Solomon 57'; Dabbur 64'; Natkho 66'	Stadium: Stadionul Zimbru; Attendance: 0 Referee: Bojan Pandžić (Sweden)

5 June Friendly	Montenegro	1–3	Israel	Podgorica, Montenegro
20:45	Bećiraj 81' (pen.)	Report; Report (UEFA)	Zahavi 67'; Solomon 69'; Kinda 90+1'	Stadium: Podgorica City Stadium; Attendance: 860; Referee: Irfan Peljto (Bosnia and Herzegovina)

9 June Friendly	Portugal	4–0	Israel	Lisbon, Portugal
20:45 (21:45 UTC+2)	Fernandes 42', 90+1'; Ronaldo 44'; Cancelo 86'	Report; Report (UEFA)		Stadium: Estádio José Alvalade; Attendance: 0 Referee: Jérémie Pignard (France)

1 September 2022 FIFA World Cup qualification	Faroe Islands	0–4	Israel	Tórshavn, Faroe Islands
20:45 (21:45 UTC+3)		Report (FIFA); Report (UEFA)	Zahavi 14', 44', 90+2'; Dabbur 52'	Stadium: Tórsvøllur; Attendance: 2,666; Referee: Dennis Higler (Netherlands)

4 September 2022 FIFA World Cup qualification	Israel	5–2	Austria	Haifa, Israel
20:45 (21:45 UTC+3)	Solomon 5'; Dabbur 20'; Zahavi 33', 90+1'; Weissman 58'	Report (FIFA); Report (UEFA)	Baumgartner 42'; Arnautović 55'	Stadium: Sammy Ofer Stadium; Attendance: 13,550; Referee: Felix Zwayer (Germany)

7 September 2022 FIFA World Cup qualification	Denmark	5–0	Israel	Copenhagen, Denmark
20:45 (21:45 UTC+3)	Poulsen 28'; Kjær 31'; Skov Olsen 41'; Delaney 58'; Cornelius 90+1'	Report (FIFA); Report (UEFA)		Stadium: Parken Stadium; Attendance: 18,800; Referee: Tobias Stieler (Germany)

9 October 2022 FIFA World Cup qualification	Scotland	3–2	Israel	Glasgow, Scotland
17:00 (19:00 UTC+3)	McGinn 30'; Dykes 57'; McTominay 90+4'	Report (FIFA); Report (UEFA)	Zahavi 5'; Dabbur 32'	Stadium: Hampden Park; Attendance: 50,585; Referee: Szymon Marciniak (Poland)

12 October 2022 FIFA World Cup qualification	Israel	2–1	Moldova	Be'er Sheva, Israel
21:45 (21:45 UTC+3)	Zahavi 28'; Dabbur 49'	Report (FIFA); Report (UEFA)	Nicolaescu 90+4'	Stadium: Turner Stadium; Attendance: 9,000; Referee: Andris Treimanis (Latvia)

12 November 2022 FIFA World Cup qualification	Austria	4–2	Israel	Klagenfurt, Austria
20:45 (21:45 UTC+2)	Arnautović 51' (pen.); Schaub 62', 72'; Sabitzer 84'	Report (FIFA); Report (UEFA)	Bitton 33'; Peretz 59'	Stadium: Wörthersee Stadion; Attendance: 4,300; Referee: Ovidiu Hațegan (Romania)

15 November 2022 FIFA World Cup qualification	Israel	3–2	Faroe Islands	Netanya, Israel
19:45 (21:45 UTC+2)	Dabbur 30' (pen.); Weissman 58'; Peretz 75'	Report (FIFA); Report (UEFA)	Vatnhamar 62'; K. Olsen 72'	Stadium: Netanya Stadium; Attendance: 6,800; Referee: Jérôme Brisard (France)

=== 2022 ===
26 March Friendly	Germany	2–0	Israel	Sinsheim, Germany
21:45 UTC+2 (22:45 UTC+3)	Havertz 36'; Werner 45+1'	Report; Report (UEFA)		Stadium: PreZero Arena; Attendance: 25,600; Referee: Maurizio Mariani (Italy)

29 March Friendly	Israel	2–2	Romania	Netanya, Israel
20:45 UTC+3 (20:45 UTC+3)	Dabbur 57', 85'	Report; Report (UEFA)	Cicâldău 10'; Man 23'	Stadium: Netanya Stadium; Attendance: 6,970; Referee: Daniel Stefański (Poland)

2 June 2022–23 UEFA Nations League	Israel	2–2	Iceland	Haifa, Israel
18:45 (21:45 UTC+3)	Abada 25'; Weissman 84'	Report (UEFA)	Helgason 42'; Sigurðsson 53'	Stadium: Sammy Ofer Stadium; Attendance: 13,150; Referee: Andris Treimanis (Latvia)

6 June 2022–23 UEFA Nations League	Israel	Cancelled	Russia	Haifa, Israel (Note: On 2 May 2022, UEFA announced that Russia were suspended and automatically relegated to League C due to their country's invasion of Ukraine.)
19:45 (21:45 UTC+3)		Report (UEFA)		Stadium: Sammy Ofer Stadium

10 June 2022–23 UEFA Nations League	Albania	1–2	Israel	Tirana, Albania
20:45 (21:45 UTC+3)	Broja 45+2' (pen.)	Report (UEFA)	Solomon 57', 73'	Stadium: Arena Kombëtare; Attendance: 18,100; Referee: Tiago Martins (Portugal)

13 June 2022–23 UEFA Nations League	Iceland	2–2	Israel	Reykjavík, Iceland
18:45 (21:45 UTC+3)	Þorsteinsson 9'; Helgason 60'	Report (UEFA)	Grétarsson 35' (o.g.); Peretz 65'	Stadium: Laugardalsvöllur; Attendance: 2,778; Referee: Duje Strukan (Croatia)

24 September 2022–23 UEFA Nations League	Israel	2–1	Albania	Tel Aviv, Israel
20:45 (21:45 UTC+3)	Weissman 46'; Baribo 90+2'	Report (UEFA)	Uzuni 88'	Stadium: Bloomfield Stadium; Attendance: 29,200; Referee: Donatas Rumšas (Lithuania)

27 September 2022–23 UEFA Nations League	Russia	Cancelled	Israel	Russia
19:45 (21:45 UTC+3)		Report (UEFA)

27 September Friendly	Malta	2–1	Israel	Ta' Qali, Malta
21:00 UTC+2 (22:00 UTC+3)	Satariano 84'; Apap 86'	Report	Natcho 32' (pen.)	Stadium: National Stadium; Referee: Eldorjan Hamiti (Albania)

17 November Friendly	Israel	4–2	Zambia	Petah Tikva, Israel
19:30	Baribo 21'; David 24'; Kabwe 89' (o.g.); Shviro 90+3'		Kangwa 55'; Bwalya 66'	Stadium: HaMoshava Stadium; Attendance: 5,243; Referee: Arda Kardeşler (Turkey)

20 November Friendly	Israel	2–3	Cyprus	Petah Tikva, Israel
18:45	Gloukh 66'; Baribo 67'	Report	Charalambous 2'; Pittas 24'; Ioannou 82'	Stadium: HaMoshava Stadium; Attendance: 7,352; Referee: Arda Kardeşler (Turkey)

=== 2023 ===
25 March UEFA Euro 2024 qualifying	Israel	1–1	Kosovo	Tel Aviv, Israel
20:45 (22:45 UTC+3)	Peretz 56'	Report (UEFA)	Dasa 36' (o.g.)	Stadium: Bloomfield Stadium; Attendance: 28,935; Referee: Willie Collum (Scotland)

28 March UEFA Euro 2024 qualifying	Switzerland	3–0	Israel	Geneva, Switzerland
20:45	Vargas 39'; Amdouni 47'; Widmer 52'	Report (UEFA)		Stadium: Stade de Genève; Attendance: 14,819; Referee: Nikola Dabanović (Montenegro)

16 June UEFA Euro 2024 qualifying	Belarus	1–2	Israel	Budapest, Hungary (Note: Due to the Belarusian country's involvement in the Russian invasion of Ukraine, Belarus are required to play their home matches at neutral venues and behind closed doors until further notice.)
20:45	Ebong 16'	Report (UEFA)	Weissman 85' (pen.); Gloukh 90+2'	Stadium: Szusza Ferenc Stadion; Attendance: 0 Referee: Jarred Gillett (Australia)

19 June UEFA Euro 2024 qualifying	Israel	2–1	Andorra	Jerusalem, Israel
20:45 (21:45 UTC+3)	Shlomo 42'; Solomon 61'	Report (UEFA)	Rosas 52'	Stadium: Teddy Stadium; Attendance: 13,300; Referee: Dragomir Draganov (Bulgaria)

9 September UEFA Euro 2024 qualifying	Romania	1–1	Israel	Bucharest, Romania
20:45 (21:45 UTC+3)	Alibec 27'	Report (UEFA)	Gloukh 53'	Stadium: Stadionul Steaua; Attendance: 49,193; Referee: Slavko Vinčić (Slovenia)

12 September UEFA Euro 2024 qualifying	Israel	1–0	Belarus	Tel Aviv, Israel
20:45 (21:45 UTC+3)	Kanichowsky 90+3'	Report (UEFA)		Stadium: Bloomfield Stadium; Attendance: 28,435; Referee: Willy Delajod (France)

12 November (Note: The Kosovo v Israel match, originally scheduled to be played on 15 October 2023, was postponed to 12 November 2023 due to the Gaza war.) UEFA Euro 2024 qualifying	Kosovo	1–0	Israel	Pristina, Kosovo
20:45	Rashica 41'	Report (UEFA)		Stadium: Fadil Vokrri Stadium; Attendance: 5,245; Referee: Ivan Kružliak (Slovakia)

15 November (Note: The Israel v Switzerland match, originally scheduled to be played on 12 October 2023 at the Bloomfield Stadium, Tel Aviv, was postponed to a date to determine due and relocated to a neutral site due to the Gaza war.) UEFA Euro 2024 qualifying	Israel	1–1	Switzerland	Felcsút, Hungary (Note: Due to the Gaza war, Israel play their remaining home matches at a neutral venue.)
20:45	Weissman 88'	Report (UEFA)	Vargas 36'	Stadium: Pancho Aréna; Attendance: 2,024; Referee: Anthony Taylor (England)

18 November UEFA Euro 2024 qualifying	Israel	1–2	Romania	Felcsút, Hungary
20:45 (21:45 UTC+2)	Zahavi 2'	Report (UEFA)	Pușcaș 10'; Hagi 63'	Stadium: Pancho Aréna (Note: The Israel v Romania match, originally scheduled to be played at the Teddy Stadium, Jerusalem, was relocated to a neutral site due to the Gaza war.); Attendance: 2,921; Referee: François Letexier (France)

21 November UEFA Euro 2024 qualifying	Andorra	0–2	Israel	Andorra la Vella, Andorra
20:45		Report (UEFA)	Cervós 29' (o.g.); Kinda 81'	Stadium: Estadi Nacional; Attendance: 568; Referee: Sascha Stegemann (Germany)

=== 2024 ===
21 March UEFA Euro 2024 qualifying play-offs	Israel	1–4	Iceland	Budapest, Hungary
20:45	Zahavi 31' (pen.)	Report	A. Guðmundsson 39', 83', 87'; Traustason 42'	Stadium: Szusza Ferenc Stadion; Attendance: 1,226; Referee: Anthony Taylor (England)

8 June Friendly	Hungary	3–0	Israel	Debrecen, Hungary
18:00	Sallai 11'; Varga 19', 22'	Report		Stadium: Nagyerdei Stadion; Attendance: 19,900; Referee: Cláudio Pereira (Portugal)

11 June Friendly	Belarus	0–4	Israel	Budapest, Hungary (Note: Due to the Belarusian involvement in the Russian invasion of Ukraine and Gaza war, Belarus and Israel are required to play their home matches at neutral venues and behind closed doors until further notice.)
18:00 UTC+2		Report	Melamed 7'; Safouri 18'; Shlomo 36'; Kna'an 82'	Stadium: Szusza Ferenc Stadion; Referee: Tamás Bognár (Hungary)

6 September 2024–25 UEFA Nations League	Belgium	3–1	Israel	Debrecen, Hungary (Note: Due to the Gaza war protests, the Belgium v Israel match was played at a neutral venue and behind closed doors.)
20:45 (21:45 UTC+3)	De Bruyne 21', 52' (pen.); Tielemans 48'	Report (UEFA)	Castagne 36' (o.g.)	Stadium: Nagyerdei Stadion; Attendance: 0 Referee: Michael Oliver (England)

9 September 2024–25 UEFA Nations League	Israel	1–2	Italy	Budapest, Hungary
20:45 (21:45 UTC+3)	Abu Fani 90'	Report (UEFA)	Frattesi 38'; Kean 62'	Stadium: Bozsik Aréna; Attendance: 2,090; Referee: Ivan Kružliak (Slovakia)

10 October 2024–25 UEFA Nations League	Israel	1–4	France	Budapest, Hungary
20:45 (21:45 UTC+3)	Gandelman 24'	Report (UEFA)	Camavinga 7'; Nkunku 28'; Guendouzi 87'; Barcola 89'	Stadium: Bozsik Aréna; Attendance: 2,226; Referee: Nikola Dabanović (Montenegro)

14 October 2024–25 UEFA Nations League	Italy	4–1	Israel	Udine, Italy
20:45 (21:45 UTC+3)	Retegui 41' (pen.); Di Lorenzo 54', 79'; Frattesi 72'	Report (UEFA)	Abu Fani 66'	Stadium: Stadio Friuli; Attendance: 11,700; Referee: Ricardo de Burgos Bengoetxea (Spain)

14 November 2024–25 UEFA Nations League	France	0–0	Israel	Saint-Denis, France
20:45 (21:45 UTC+3)		Report (UEFA)		Stadium: Stade de France; Attendance: 16,611; Referee: Tobias Stieler (Germany)

17 November 2024–25 UEFA Nations League	Israel	1–0	Belgium	Budapest, Hungary
20:45 (21:45 UTC+3)	Shua 86'	Report (UEFA)		Stadium: Bozsik Aréna; Attendance: 675; Referee: Sebastian Gishamer (Austria)

=== 2025 ===
22 March 2026 FIFA World Cup qualification	Israel	2–1	Estonia	Debrecen, Hungary
20:45	Hein 23' (o.g.); Dasa 75'	Report	Paskotši 10'	Stadium: Nagyerdei Stadion; Attendance: 270; Referee: Nikola Dabanović (Montenegro)

25 March 2026 FIFA World Cup qualification	Israel	2–4	Norway	Debrecen, Hungary
20:45	Abu Fani 55'; Turgeman 90+3'	Report	Møller Wolfe 39'; Sørloth 59'; Ajer 65'; Haaland 83'	Stadium: Nagyerdei Stadion; Attendance: 1,200; Referee: Chris Kavanagh (England)

6 June 2026 FIFA World Cup qualification	Estonia	1–3	Israel	Tallinn, Estonia
20:45 (21:45 UTC+3)	Käit 31'	Report	Biton 39', 49'; Abu Fani 89' (pen.)	Stadium: Lilleküla Stadium; Attendance: 5,967; Referee: Willy Delajod (France)

10 June Friendly	Israel	1–0	Slovakia	Debrecen, Hungary
20:45 (21:45 UTC+3)	Shua 47'	Report		Stadium: Nagyerdei Stadion; Attendance: 69; Referee: Matteo Marchetti (Italy)

5 September 2026 FIFA World Cup qualification	Moldova	0–4	Israel	Chișinău, Moldova
20:45 (21:45 UTC+3)		Report	Peretz 15'; Solomon 35'; Baribo 59'; Gloukh 77'	Stadium: Zimbru Stadium; Attendance: 7,242; Referee: John Beaton (Scotland)

8 September 2026 FIFA World Cup qualification	Israel	4–5	Italy	Debrecen, Hungary
20:45	Locatelli 16' (o.g.); Do. Peretz 52', 89'; Bastoni 87' (o.g.)	Report	Kean 40', 54'; Politano 59'; Raspadori 81'; Tonali 90+1'	Stadium: Nagyerdei Stadion; Attendance: 2,540; Referee: Slavko Vinčić (Slovenia)

11 October 2026 FIFA World Cup qualification	Norway	5–0	Israel	Oslo, Norway
18:00	Khalaili 17' (o.g.); Haaland 27', 63', 72'; Nachmias 28' (o.g.)	Report		Stadium: Ullevaal Stadion; Attendance: 19,363; Referee: Szymon Marciniak (Poland)

14 October 2026 FIFA World Cup qualification	Italy	3–0	Israel	Udine, Italy
20:45	Retegui 45+2' (pen.), 74'; Mancini 90+3'	Report		Stadium: Stadio Friuli; Attendance: 9,965; Referee: Clément Turpin (France)

13 November Friendly	Lithuania	0–0	Israel	Kaunas, Lithuania
19:00 UTC+2		Report		Stadium: Darius and Girenas Stadium; Attendance: 0 (Behind closed doors); Referee: Edgars Maļcevs (Latvia)

16 November 2026 FIFA World Cup qualification	Israel	4–1	Moldova	Chișinău, Moldova
20:45	Turgeman 21' (pen.); Revivo 65'; E. Peretz 85'; Baboglo 88' (o.g.)	Report	Nicolaescu 37'	Stadium: Zimbru Stadium; Attendance: 3,312; Referee: Allard Lindhout (Netherlands)

=== 2026 ===
26 March Friendly	Georgia	2–2	Israel	Tbilisi, Georgia
20:00 UTC+4	Kvaratskhelia 36', 54'	Report	Mizrahi 60'; Gandelman 64'	Stadium: Mikheil Meskhi Stadium; Attendance: 16,556; Referee: Julian Weinberger (Austria)

3 June Friendly	Albania	0–1	Israel	Tirana, Albania
20:00 UTC+2		Report	Gloukh 73'	Stadium: Arena Kombëtare; Attendance: 6,600; Referee: Miloš Savović (Montenegro)

24 September 2026–27 UEFA Nations League	Austria	3–1	Israel	Vienna, Austria
20:45 UTC+2	Schmid 43' (pen.); Mwene 90'; Kalajdžić 90+3'	Report	Abu Farchi 55'	Stadium: Ernst-Happel-Stadion; Attendance: 15,200; Referee: Georgi Kabakov (Bulgaria)

27 September 2026–27 UEFA Nations League	Israel	0–3	Republic of Ireland	Debrecen, Hungary
21:45 UTC+3		Report	Parrott 13'; Idah 16'; Moylan 25'	Stadium: Nagyerdei Stadion; Attendance: 319; Referee: Harm Osmers (Germany)

1 October 2026–27 UEFA Nations League	Israel	0–0	Kosovo	Debrecen, Hungary
21:45 UTC+3		Report		Stadium: Nagyerdei Stadion; Attendance: 440; Referee: Radu Petrescu (Romania)

4 October 2026–27 UEFA Nations League	Republic of Ireland	1–1	Israel	Bačka Topola, Serbia (Note: Moved from Ireland to Serbia after the FAI Board decided to move the fixture to a neutral territory due to "operational challenges that could impact on the delivery of the game on home soil.")
19:45 UTC+1	Parrott 39'	Report	D. Peretz 47'	Stadium: TSC Arena; Attendance: 0 (Behind closed doors); Referee: Juan Martínez Munuera (Spain)

14 November 2026–27 UEFA Nations League	Kosovo	0–0	Israel	Pristina, Kosovo
15:00 UTC+1		Report		Stadium: Fadil Vokrri Stadium; Attendance: 12,426; Referee: Ivan Kružliak (Slovakia)

17 November 2026–27 UEFA Nations League	Israel	1–1	Austria	Debrecen, Hungary
21:45 UTC+2	Do. Peretz 36'	Report	Kalajdžić 62'	Stadium: Nagyerdei Stadion; Attendance: 510; Referee: Davide Massa (Italy)

== Forthcoming fixtures ==
The following matches are scheduled:

== See also ==
- Israel national football team results (1990–2019)
- Israel national football team results (1960–1989)
- Israel national football team results (1934–1959)
