= Yossi Abukasis =

Israeli footballer and coach

Yossi Abukasis יוסי אבוקסיס
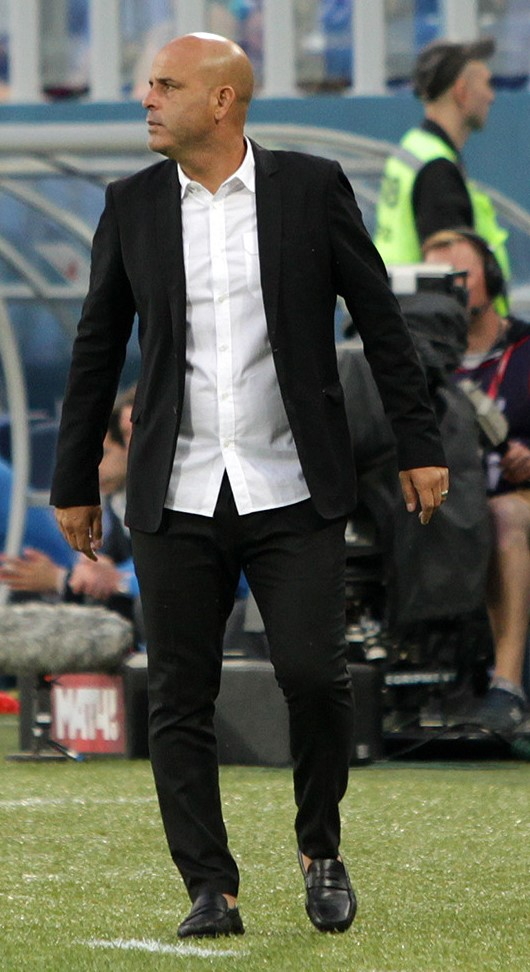
- Coaching Bnei Yehuda in 2017

Personal information
- Full name: Yosef Abukasis יוסף אבוקסיס
- Date of birth: 10 September 1970 (age 56)
- Place of birth: Bat Yam, Israel
- Height: 1.78 m (5 ft 10 in)
- Position: Midfielder

Team information
- Current team: Bnei Sakhnin (manager)

Youth career
- Hapoel Tel Aviv

Senior career*
Years	Team	Apps	(Gls)
1987–1993	Hapoel Tel Aviv	87	(7)
1993–1994	Bnei Yehuda	29	(4)
1994–1995	Tzafririm Holon	30	(5)
1995–2001	Beitar Jerusalem	203	(17)
2001–2003	Hapoel Tel Aviv	59	(7)
2003	F.C. Ashdod	7	(0)
2003–2007	Hapoel Tel Aviv	116	(16)
2008–2010	Maccabi Kabilio Jaffa	44	(7)

International career
1990–1991	Israel U21	2	(0)
1996–2003	Israel	35	(3)

Managerial career
- 2008–2011: Hapoel Tel Aviv (assistant)
- 2011–2012: Bnei Yehuda
- 2012–2013: Israel (assistant)
- 2012–2013: Hapoel Tel Aviv
- 2013–2015: Bnei Yehuda
- 2015–2017: Bnei Sakhnin
- 2017–2020: Bnei Yehuda
- 2020–2021: Hapoel Be'er Sheva
- 2021–2022: Bnei Yehuda
- 2022–2024: Beitar Jerusalem
- 2024: Hapoel Tel Aviv
- 2024–2026: Maccabi Netanya
- 2026–: Bnei Sakhnin
- * Club domestic league appearances and goals

Yosef "Yossi" Abukasis (Hebrew: יֹוסֶף "יֹוסִי" אָבּוּקָסִיס; born September 10, 1970) is an Israeli former football midfielder and current coach of Bnei Sakhnin.

== Career ==
Abukasis played in the youth team of Hapoel Tel Aviv, and in 1987/1988 season arrived to the first team. In that year Hapoel won the championship and Abukasis signed in the team for the next 5 years. In 1994/1995 season Abukasis played in Bnei Yehuda Tel Aviv. A season after he played in Tzafririm Holon and in the next season he moved to Beitar Jerusalem FC. Abukasis played in Beitar from 1995/1996 until 2000/2001, and in his time Beitar won two championships and the Toto Cup. Abukasis also participated in the 2000 2000 UEFA European Football Championship qualifying with the Israel national football team.

In 2001/2002 season Abukasis came back to his youth team, Hapoel Tel Aviv, and won the Toto Cup. During 2003/2004 season he played half a year in F.C. Ashdod, but after that he went back to Hapoel Tel Aviv, where he completed his career.

On 14 June 2011, Abukasis was appointed as the manager of Bnei Yehuda.

On 27 September 2012, Abukasis was appointed as the manager of Hapoel Tel Aviv due to former Hapoel manager Nitzan Shirazi’s health.

== Honours ==
=== As a player ===
- Israeli Premier League (3):
  - 1987-88, 1996–97, 1997–98
- Israel State Cup (2):
  - 2006, 2007
- Toto Cup (2):
  - 1997-98, 2001–02
- Liga Gimel (1):
  - 2008-09
- Liga Bet (1):
  - 2009-10

=== As a manager ===
- Israel State Cup (3):
  - 2019, 2020, 2023

=== Individual ===
- Member of the Israeli Football Hall of Fame
