= Inge Ejderstedt =

Swedish footballer

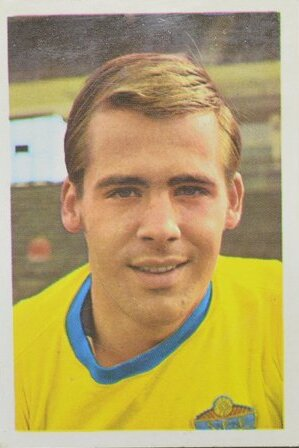
- Ejderstedt in the 1970 FIFA World Cup

Personal information
- Full name: Inge Åke Emanuel Ejderstedt
- Date of birth: 24 December 1946 (age 79)
- Place of birth: Lenhovda, Sweden
- Position: Midfielder

Senior career*
Years	Team	Apps	(Gls)
1967–1970	Östers IF	71	(44)
1970–1974	R.S.C. Anderlecht	81	(29)
1974–1976	Östers IF	66	(18)

International career
1968–1974	Sweden	23	(8)
- * Club domestic league appearances and goals

Inge Åke Emanuel Ejderstedt (born 24 December 1946) is a Swedish former professional footballer who played as a midfielder.

Ejderstedt began his career in Östers IF and became Swedish champion in 1968. 1970-1974 he played for RSC Anderlecht in Belgium he won the Belgian league in 1972 and 1974. In 1974, he returned to Sweden.

As a midfielder Inge Ejderstedt was a member of the Sweden men's national football team 23 times. He played for Sweden in the 1970 FIFA World Cup and the 1974 FIFA World Cup.
