= Ivan Hoste =

Belgian footballer (born 1952)

Personal information
- Date of birth: 8 December 1952 (age 73)
- Place of birth: Tongeren, Belgium
- Height: 1.72 m (5 ft 8 in)
- Position: Winger

Senior career*
| Years | Team | Apps | (Gls) |
| 1971–1983 | K.S.K. Tongeren | | |
| 1983–1985 | K.V. Mechelen | | |
| 1985–1987 | Patro Eisden | | |

International career
| 1982 | Belgium | 1 | (0) |
- * Club domestic league appearances and goals

Ivan Hoste (born 8 December 1952) is a Belgian former footballer who played as a winger. He made one appearance for the Belgium national team in 1982.
