= Mogens Hansen =

Danish footballer (born 1956)

Personal information
- Full name: Mogens René Holm Hansen
- Date of birth: 12 April 1956 (age 70)
- Place of birth: Herlufsholm, Denmark
- Position: Forward

Senior career*
Years	Team	Apps	(Gls)
1975–1977	Næstved IF		
1977–1979	SpVgg Bayreuth	45	(21)
1975–1989	Næstved IF		

International career
1976–1984	Denmark	5	(1)
- * Club domestic league appearances and goals

Mogens René Holm Hansen (born 12 April 1956) is a Danish former footballer who played as a forward. He made five appearances for the Denmark national team from 1976 to 1984.
