= Syed Ahmad Syed Abu Bakar =

Malaysian footballer (1946–2022)

Syed Ahmad
Personal information
- Full name: Syed Ahmad bin Syed Abu Bakar
- Date of birth: 20 April 1946
- Place of birth: Johor, Malayan Union
- Date of death: 1 June 2022 (aged 76)
- Place of death: Perlis, Malaysia
- Position: Striker

Senior career*
Years	Team	Apps	(Gls)
1963–1964	Johor FA		
1965–1969	Penang		
1970–1973	Penjara FC		
1974–1979	Perak		
1980–1981	Kedah		

International career
1965–1974	Malaysia		
- * Club domestic league appearances and goals

Syed Ahmad Syed Abu Bakar (20 April 1946 – 1 June 2022) was a Malaysian footballer who played as a striker.

== Career ==
With the Malaysia national team, Ahmad scored four goals in the Olympics qualification matches against Japan, South Korea and Philippines that helped Malaysia to qualify for 1972 Munich Olympics.

On 15 September 1974, he was a part of the team that won third place bronze medal in the 1974 Asian Games. He died at age 76 due to cancer.

== Honours ==
Penang

- Burnley Cup: 1966
- Malaysia Kings Gold Cup: 1966, 1968, 1969
- Malaysia Cup: runner-up 1968, 1969

Penjara

- Malaya FAM Cup: 1970, 1971, 1973

Perak

- Malaysia Kings Gold Cup: 1974
- Malaysia Cup: runner-up 1974

Malaysia

- Pestabola Merdeka: 1968, 1974
- Asian Games: bronze medal 1974
