= Moshe Onana =

Israeli footballer and manager

Moshe Onana משה אונה
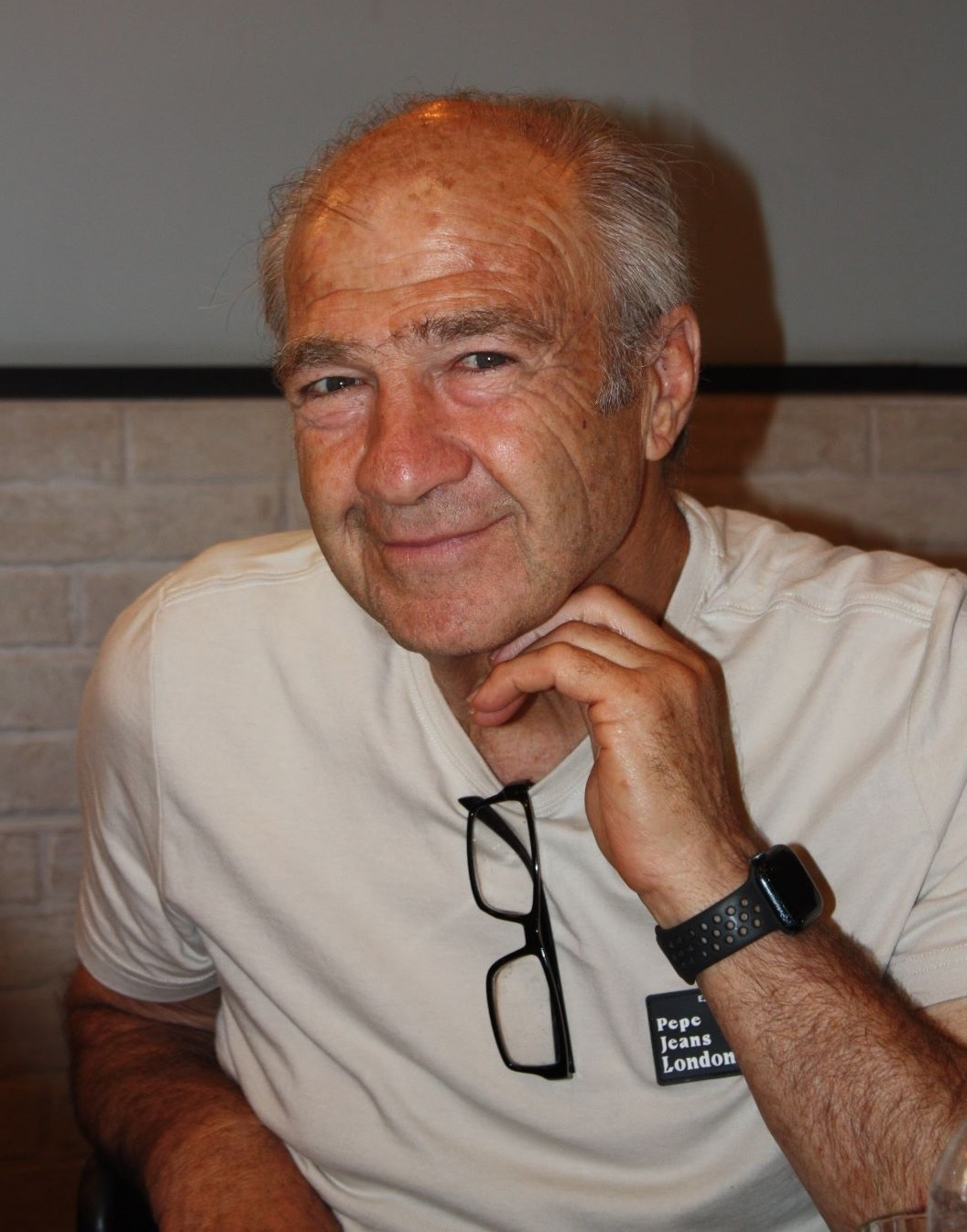

Personal information
- Date of birth: January 13, 1950 (age 76)
- Place of birth: Jerusalem, Israel
- Position: Striker

Team information
- Current team: Maccabi Jaffa

Youth career
- Maccabi Jaffa

Senior career*
Years	Team	Apps	(Gls)
1967–1982	Maccabi Jaffa	379	(113)
1982–1985	Bnei Yehuda	55	(12)
1985	Hakoah Ramat Gan	4	(0)

International career
1973–1974	Israel	16	(10)

Managerial career
- 1998–1999: Maccabi Jaffa
- 2000–2002: Sektzia Nes Tziona
- Hapoel Be'er Ya'akov
- 2008–2009: Maccabi Be'er Ya'akov
- 2010–2012: Maccabi Jaffa
- * Club domestic league appearances and goals

Moshe Onana (Hebrew: משה אונה; born January 13, 1950, in Jerusalem) is a former Israeli soccer player and soccer coach, who played as a striker. He scored 114 league goals, 15 goals in the Israeli state soccer cup and 2 goals in the Intertoto tournament. He was a key figure for Maccabi Jaffa during the 1970s and early 1980s and remains the team's all-time top scorer.

== Honours ==
- Liga Leumit (top division):
  - Runner-up (1): 1976–77
- Liga Alef/Liga Artzit (second tier):
  - Winner (2): 1970–71, 1984–85
