= Shalom Tikva =

Israeli footballer

Personal information
- Date of birth: May 8, 1965 (age 61)
- Place of birth: Netanya, Israel
- Position: Attacking midfielder

Youth career
- Maccabi Netanya

Senior career*
Years	Team	Apps	(Gls)
1982–1988	Maccabi Netanya	108	(31)
1988–1991	Standard de Liège	56	(21)
1991–1992	Lens	10	(3)
1992–1993	K. Boom F.C.	9	(1)
1993–1994	Maccabi Netanya	16	(2)
1994–1995	Neuchâtel Xamax	0	(0)
1995–1996	Standard de Liège	7	(1)
1996–2000	Hapoel Tel Aviv	78	(15)

International career
1986–1994	Israel	23	(6)

Managerial career
- 2000–2001: Hapoel Tel Aviv (assistant)
- 2004–2005: Hapoel Tel Aviv
- * Club domestic league appearances and goals

Shalom Tikva (Hebrew: שלום תקווה; born May 8, 1965) is an Israeli former professional footballer who played as an attacking midfielder. He made 23 appearances scoring 6 goals for the Israel national team.

== Honours ==
Maccabi Netanya

- Israeli Championship: runner-up 1987–88
- Toto Cup: runner-up 1986–87

Standard de Liège

- Belgian Cup: runner-up 1988–89

Hapoel Tel Aviv

- Israeli Championship:1999-00; runner-up 1997–98
- Israel State Cup:1999, 2000

Individual

- Member of the Israeli Football Hall of Fame
