= Ronnie Calderon =

Israeli footballer (born 1952)

Personal information
- Full name: Aharon Calderon
- Date of birth: February 5, 1952 (age 74)
- Place of birth: Tel Aviv, Israel
- Position: Midfielder

Senior career*
Years	Team	Apps	(Gls)
1969–1970	Hapoel Tel Aviv	13	(2)
1970–1971	Ajax	0	(0)
1971–1973	Hapoel Tel Aviv	46	(1)
1973–1974	Feyenoord	0	(0)
1974	Paris FC	2	(0)
1975–1976	Hapoel Ramat Gan	-	(-)

International career
- Israel U-19
1971–1972	Israel	9	(1)
- * Club domestic league appearances and goals

Ronnie Calderon (Hebrew: רוני קלדרון; born February 5, 1952) is an Israeli former professional footballer who played as a midfielder. He made nine appearances, scoring one goal for the Israel national team.

== Honours ==
Hapoel Tel Aviv

- Israeli Championship: 1968–69
- AFC Youth Championship: 1971
- Israel State Cup: 1972
