= Giora Spiegel =

Israeli footballer (born 1947)

Giora Spiegel גיורא שפיגל
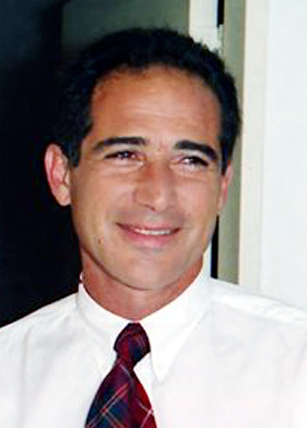
- Spiegel in 1991

Personal information
- Full name: Giora Spiegel
- Date of birth: July 27, 1947 (age 79)
- Place of birth: Petah Tikva, Israel
- Height: 5 ft 11 in (1.80 m)
- Position: Midfielder

Senior career*
Years	Team	Apps	(Gls)
1965–1973	Maccabi Tel Aviv	176	(68)
1973–1978	Strasbourg	97	(23)
1978–1979	Lyon	43	(9)
1979	Maccabi Tel Aviv	26	(2)
1979–1980	Hakoah Ramat Gan	28	(6)
1980–1981	Beitar Tel Aviv	33	(9)
Total		403	(117)

International career
- Israel U-19
1965–1980	Israel	44	(18)

Managerial career
- 1983–1988: Hapoel Petah Tikva
- 1988–1989: Maccabi Tel Aviv
- 1989–1992: Bnei Yehuda
- 1993–1998: Maccabi Haifa
- 1999–2000: Bnei Yehuda
- 2000–2002: Ironi Rishon LeZion
- 2007–2008: Beitar Jerusalem (general manager)
- * Club domestic league appearances and goals

Giora Spiegel (Hebrew: גיורא שפיגל; born July 27, 1947) is an Israeli former footballer and coach. As a footballer, he holds the record for the longest Israeli international career, spanning 14 years and 357 days.

== Biography ==
Born in Petah Tikva, Giora Spiegel is the son of Eliezer Spiegel, who played for Maccabi Petah Tikva and the Israel national team. He is Jewish. Spiegel attended Herzliya Hebrew High School. In university he studied accountancy.

== Playing career ==
As a youth, he played with Maccabi Tel Aviv, and was marked early on as a future talent. By age 17, he was leading the national U-21 side to Asian championships and by 18, he had been called up to the full side. In the summer of 1970 he played as a forward for the Israel national team at the 1970 World Cup finals in Mexico.

In 1973, he fought with Maccabi manager, Jerry Beit haLevi over transferring to a club in France. He later left for France in 1974 to play for French side Strasbourg, returning in 1979 to rejoin Maccabi.

== Managerial career ==
Spiegel began his career as a manager in Hapoel Petah Tikva in the mid-1980s . After several years he moved to Maccabi Tel Aviv, which won the State Cup. After problems with some of the players and a 10–0 defeat to Maccabi Haifa, Spiegel was fired.

In 1989, he moved to Bnei Yehuda, which won the Israeli Championship in 1990. In 1993, he moved to Maccabi Haifa. The team won the Israeli Championship that year without losing a single game the whole season. Under his lead, Haifa won the State Cup twice, in 1995 and in 1998.

In 1999, Spiegel returned to Bnei Yehuda. After one unsuccessful season with the club, he moved to Ironi Rishon LeZion for two years.

In July 2007, after an absence of five years from the Israeli football scene, Spiegel was hired by Beitar Jerusalem as its general manager. That year, the team won the Double. In August 2008, he retired.

== Honours ==
=== As a player ===
Maccabi Tel Aviv

- Israeli championships: 1967–68, 1969–70, 1971–72, 1978–79
- Israel State Cup: 1966–67, 1969–70, 1976–77
- Asian Club Championship: 1968–69, 1970–71

Israel

- AFC Youth Championship: 1965

Individual

- Member of the Israeli Football Hall of Fame (2009)

=== As manager ===
Maccabi Tel Aviv

- Israeli state cup: 1988

Bnei Yehuda

- Israeli league championship: 1989–90

Maccabi Haifa

- Israeli league championship: 1993–94
- Israeli state cup: 1993, 1995

== See also ==
- List of select Jewish association football (soccer) players
