= Eli Leventhal =

Israeli footballer (born 1953)

Eli Leventhal אלי לוונטל
Personal information
- Full name: Elimeleh Leventhal
- Date of birth: 18 March 1953 (age 73)
- Place of birth: Haifa, Israel
- Position: Midfielder

Senior career*
Years	Team	Apps	(Gls)
1970–1982	Hapoel Haifa		
1982–1983	Beitar Jerusalem		

International career
1974–1977	Israel	25	(1)
- * Club domestic league appearances and goals

Elimeleh Leventhal (Hebrew: אלי לוונטל; born 18 March 1953) is an Israeli former footballer. He competed in the men's tournament at the 1976 Summer Olympics.
