= Shalom Schwarz =

Israeli footballer (1951–2014)

Shalom Schwarz שלום שוורץ
Personal information
- Date of birth: 8 March 1951
- Place of birth: Hadera, Israel
- Date of death: 16 October 2014 (aged 63)

Youth career
- 1963–1968: Hapoel Hadera

Senior career*
Years	Team	Apps	(Gls)
1968–1978	Hapoel Hadera		
1978–1981	Hapoel Haifa		
1981–1983	Beitar Tel Aviv		
1983–198x	Hapoel Hadera		
- Hapoel Givat Olga
Total		246	(36)

International career
1968–1972	Israel U19		
1974–1980	Israel	11	(2)
- * Club domestic league appearances and goals

Shalom Schwarz (Hebrew: שלום שוורץ; 8 March 1951 – 16 October 2014) was an Israeli footballer who played most of his career for Hapoel Hadera and also won 11 caps for the Israel national team.

== Honours ==
Hapoel Hadera

- Israeli Second Division: 1969–70, 1972–73, 1976–77; runner-up 1968–69

Israel U19

- AFC U-19 Championship: 1971
