= Yaron Oz (footballer) =

Israeli footballer

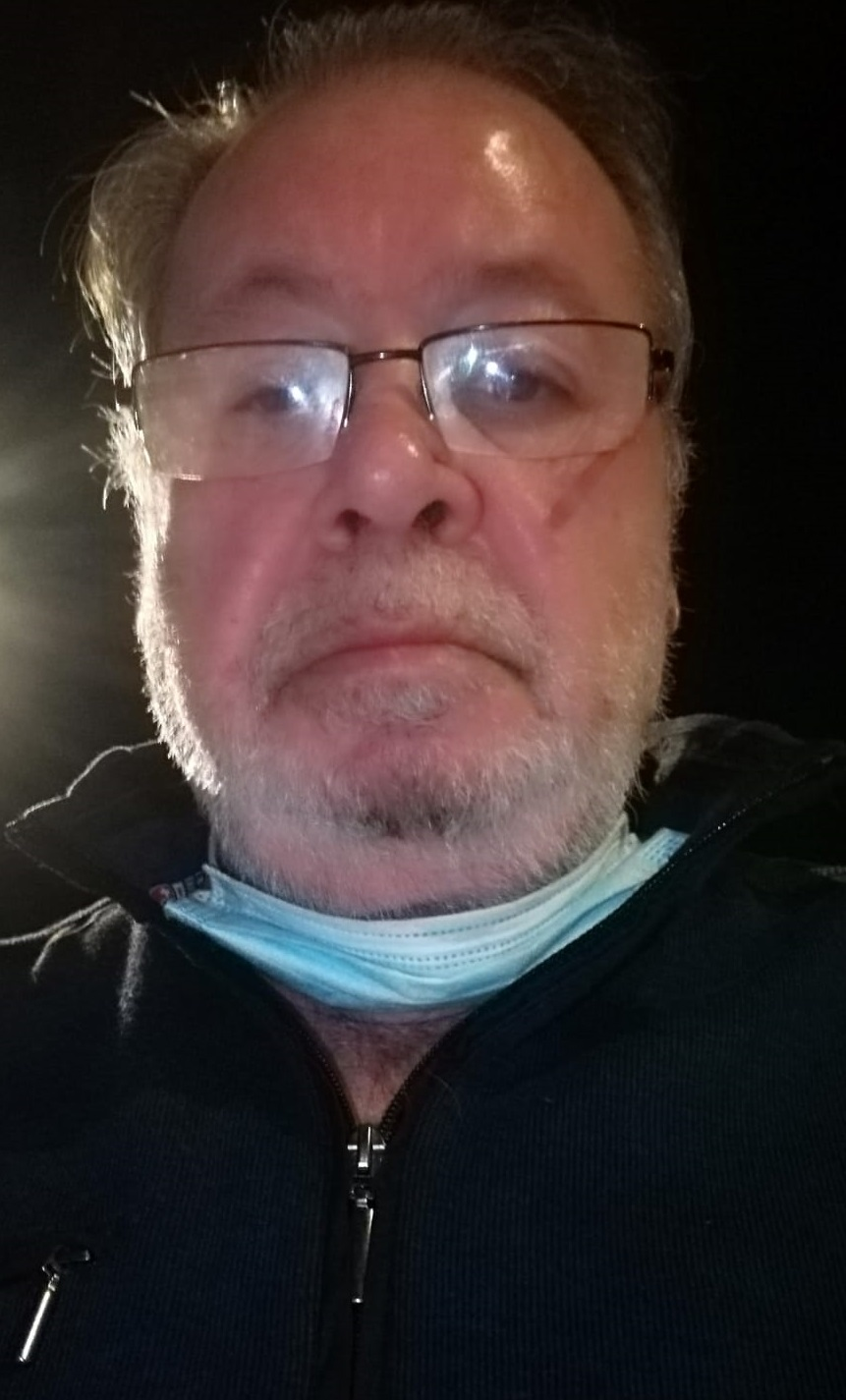

Personal information
- Full name: Yaron Oz
- Date of birth: October 5, 1952 (age 74)
- Place of birth: Tel Aviv, Israel
- Position: Midfielder

Senior career*
Years	Team	Apps	(Gls)
1970–1980	Maccabi Tel Aviv	247	(7)
1980–1983	Maccabi Jaffa		

International career
1973–1977	Israel	26	(2)
- * Club domestic league appearances and goals

Yaron Oz (Hebrew: ירון עוז) is an Israeli former footballer. He spent his professional career with Maccabi Tel Aviv F.C., as well as playing for the Israel national team.
