= Moshe Schweitzer =

Israeli footballer

Personal information
- Date of birth: 24 April 1954 (age 72)
- Place of birth: Tel Aviv, Israel
- Position: Midfielder

Youth career
- Hapoel Tel Aviv
- Maccabi Tel Aviv

Senior career*
Years	Team	Apps	(Gls)
1972-1973	Maccabi Tel Aviv	12	(1)
1973-1977	Hapoel Petah Tikva	104	(36)
1977-1983	Maccabi Tel Aviv	154	(50)
1983-1984	Hapoel Lod	4	(0)
1984	Hapoel Ramat Gan	11	(3)

International career
1974-1977	Israel	15	(6)
- * Club domestic league appearances and goals

Moshe Schweitzer (Hebrew: משה שוויצר; born 24 April 1954) is an Israeli former footballer. He competed in the men's tournament at the 1976 Summer Olympics.
