= George Borba =

Israeli footballer

George Borba ג'ורג' בורבה
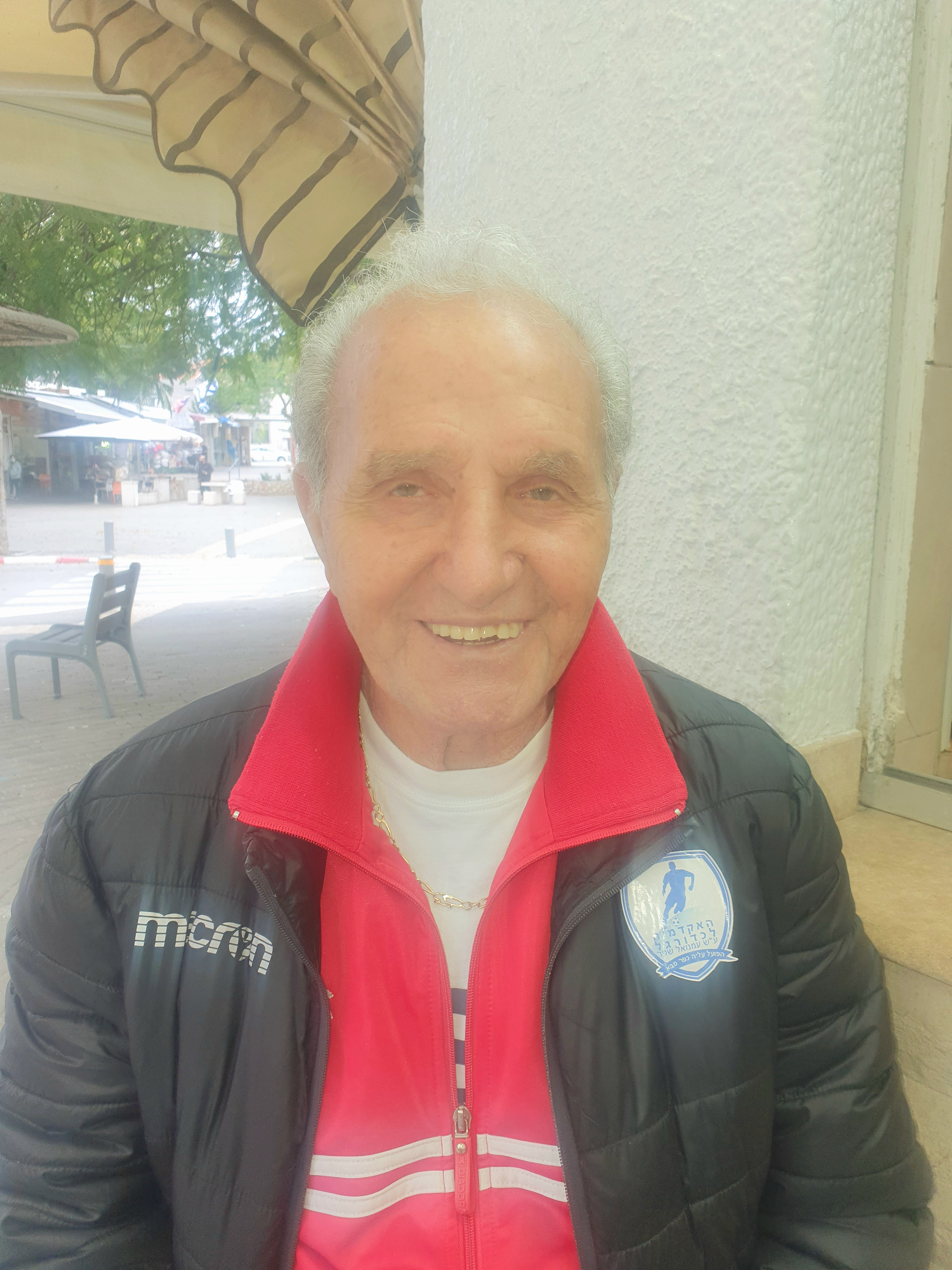
- Borba in 1973

Personal information
- Full name: Giorgio Borba
- Date of birth: 12 February 1944 (age 82)
- Place of birth: Macerata, Marche, Italy
- Position: Midfielder

Senior career*
Years	Team	Apps	(Gls)
1965–1972	Hapoel Tel Aviv		
1972–1973	Hapoel Ramat Gan		
1973–1974	Maccabi Netanya		

International career
	Israel	37	(7)
- * Club domestic league appearances and goals

George Borba (Hebrew: ג'ורג' בורבה; born on 12 February 1944in Italy), is a former Israeli international footballer who was part of the squad that competed at the 1968 Summer Olympics and the 1970 FIFA World Cup, Israel's only world cup appearance. His family was Libyan Jew from Tripoli (Libya).

== Honours ==
=== Club ===
Hapoel Tel Aviv

- AFC champions league (1): 1967
- Israeli Premier League (3): 1965–66, 1968–69, 1973–74
- Israel Super Cup (1): 1970
- Israel State Cup (1): 1972

Maccabi Netanya

- Israeli Premier League (1): 1973–74
