= Eli Driks =

Israeli former footballer (born 1964)

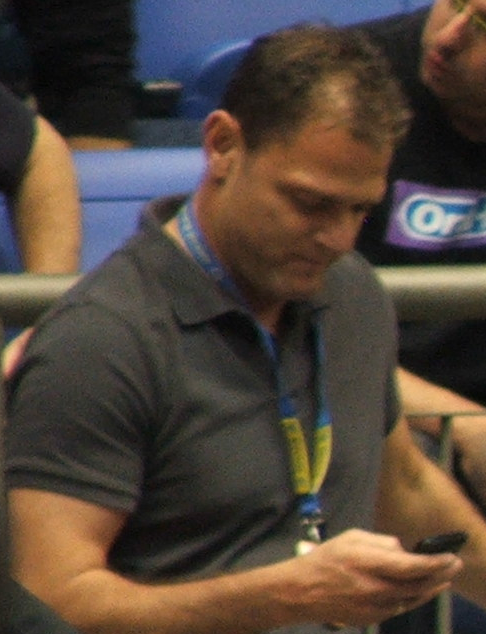

Personal information
- Full name: Eliezer Driks
- Date of birth: October 13, 1964 (age 62)
- Place of birth: Petah Tikva, Israel
- Height: 1.85 m (6 ft 1 in)
- Position: Striker

Youth career
- Maccabi Tel Aviv

Senior career*
Years	Team	Apps	(Gls)
1981–1984	Maccabi Tel Aviv		(13)
1984–1985	Maccabi Yavne		(11)
1985–1989	Maccabi Tel Aviv		(21)
1989–1990	Maccabi Netanya		(3)
1990–1999	Maccabi Tel Aviv		(79)
1999–2000	Maccabi Herzliya	5	(1)

International career
1987–1997	Israel	27	(4)
- * Club domestic league appearances and goals

Eli Driks (Hebrew: אלי דריקס; born 13 October 1964) is an Israeli former footballer who worked as marketing CEO for the basketball and football arms of Maccabi Tel Aviv.

== Career statistics ==
=== International goals ===
#	Date	Venue	Opponent	Score	Result	Competition
1.	18 October 1988	Vasermil Stadium, Be'er Sheva, Israel	Malta	2–0	Win	Friendly
2.	8 February 1989	Ramat Gan Stadium, Ramat Gan, Israel	Wales	3–3	Draw	Friendly
3.	12 February 1992	Teddy Stadium, Jerusalem, Israel	CIS	1–2	Lose	Friendly
4.	20 September 1995	Teddy Stadium, Jerusalem, Israel	Uruguay	3–1	Win	Friendly
Correct as of 28 March 2013

== Honours ==
- Israeli Premier League: 1991–92, 1994–95, 1995–96
- Israel State Cup: 1987, 1988, 1994, 1996
- Toto Cup: 1984–85, 1992–93, 1998–99
