= Zahi Armeli =

Israeli footballer

Zahi Armali زاهي أرملي
Personal information
- Date of birth: 25 October 1957 (age 69)
- Place of birth: Shefa-'Amr, Israel
- Position: Forward

Youth career
- Maccabi Shefa-'Amr

Senior career*
| Years | Team | Apps | (Gls) |
| 1973–1977 | Maccabi Shefa-'Amr | | |
| 1977–1978 | Hapoel Sakhnin | | |
| 1978–1982 | Maccabi Shefa-'Amr | | |
| 1982–1989 | Maccabi Haifa | 179 | (90) |
| 1989–1990 | Hapoel Jerusalem | 32 | (6) |
| 1990–1992 | Hapoel Tzafririm Holon | 46 | (11) |
| 1992–1993 | Hapoel Haifa | 43 | (15) |
| 1993–1996 | Maccabi Shefa-'Amr | 78 | (23) |
| 1996–1997 | Maccabi Ahi Nazareth | 24 | (5) |
| 1997–1998 | Maccabi Tamra | 28 | (8) |
| 1998–1999 | Maccabi Shefa-'Amr | 16 | (2) |

International career
| 1982–1986 | Israel | 28 | (10) |
- * Club domestic league appearances and goals

Zahi Armali (Arabic: زاهي أرملي, Hebrew: זאהי ארמלי; born 25 October 1957) is an Israeli former professional footballer who played as a forward. He started his career at Maccabi Shefa-'Amr, and a holder of many records at Maccabi Haifa.

== Early life and career ==
Armali was born and raised in Shefa-'Amr, Israel, to an Arab-Christian family. He started his professional career at Maccabi Shefa-'Amr. After a few years he spent playing in the lower leagues he signed a contract with Maccabi Haifa in 1983.

During his seven-season career at Maccabi Haifa, Zahi won three championships. He remains the club's record goalscorer with 90 league goals in 179 games.

After the 1989 season Zahi left Maccabi Haifa and subsequently played for Hapoel Jerusalem, Hapoel Haifa and his hometown club Maccabi Shefa-'Amr, where he finished his professional career as a player.
