= Gidi Damti =

Israeli footballer

Personal information
- Full name: Gideon Damti
- Date of birth: 31 October 1951 (age 74)
- Place of birth: Israel
- Position: Striker

Senior career*
Years	Team	Apps	(Gls)
1968–1989	Shimshon Tel Aviv	537	(171)

International career
1971–1981	Israel	69	(21)

Managerial career
- 2001–2002: Maccabi Netanya
- 2004–2005: Hapoel Herzliya
- 2006–2008: Sektzia Nes Tziona
- * Club domestic league appearances and goals

Gideon 'Gidi' Damti (Hebrew: גידי דמתי; born 31 October 1951) is an Israeli football manager and former player. He is manager of Sektzia Nes Tziona. He has also been manager at Maccabi Netanya.

== See also ==
- List of one-club men
