= Itzhak Shum =

Israeli footballer and manager

Personal information
- Full name: Itzhak Shum
- Date of birth: 1 September 1948 (age 78)
- Place of birth: Kishinev, Moldavian SSR
- Positions: Defender; midfielder

Youth career
- 1959–1966: Hapoel Kfar Saba

Senior career*
Years	Team	Apps	(Gls)
1966–1983	Hapoel Kfar Saba	455	(71)

International career
1969–1981	Israel	78	(10)

Managerial career
- 1983–1985: Hapoel Kfar Saba
- 1985–1986: Maccabi Sha'arayim
- 1986–1987: Hapoel Haifa
- 1987–1992: Beitar Tel Aviv
- 1992–2001: Israel (assistant manager)
- 1992–2000: Israel U-21
- 2001–2002: Hapoel Kfar Saba
- 2002–2003: Maccabi Haifa
- 2003–2004: Panathinaikos
- 2004–2005: Litex Lovech
- 2005: Alania Vladikavkaz
- 2006: Hapoel Tel Aviv
- 2007–2008: Beitar Jerusalem
- 2009–2010: Beitar Jerusalem
- 2010–2011: Alki
- * Club domestic league appearances and goals

Itzhak Shum (Hebrew: יצחק שום; born 1 September 1948 in Kishinev, Moldavian SSR) is a retired Israeli football player and manager, and currently the owner of Hapoel Kfar Saba.

== Playing career ==
He played 78 times and scored 10 goals for Israel national football team and was a participant at the 1970 FIFA World Cup and the 1968 and 1976 Olympic Games.

== Manager career ==
In the 2002–03 season, Shum was appointed to the manager of Maccabi Haifa replacing the next national manager Avram Grant. With shum. Haifa became the first ever Israeli team to reach the UEFA Champions League group stage. However, he lost the Israeli championship to Maccabi Tel Aviv because of better goal difference. In the end of the season he left to Greece.

He is one of Israel's most successful coaches ever working abroad, having led Greek side Panathinaikos to the double in 2004 and was the first time that Panathinaikos had won the Greek championship since 1996 and the Greek cup since 1995. Nevertheless, Shum was given the sack early on in the following season. Shum has also unsuccessfully managed Bulgarian side Litex Lovech and Russian side Alania Vladikavkaz. Not only this but Shum has also been a successful manager in his homeland. In the 2002–03 season Shum made history by leading Maccabi Haifa to become the first Israeli team to qualify for the group phase of the UEFA Champions League. In the group phase, the team defeated Olympiacos and the legendary Manchester United 3:0, that is still one of the greatest wins of an Israeli team ever. Haifa finished the group in third place with 7 points, allowing Maccabi Haifa a place in the UEFA Cup.

Shum was most recently the manager of Israeli side Hapoel Tel Aviv, after he replaced Dror Kashtan. He led Hapoel into the Knockout stage of the 2006–07 UEFA Cup after beating Ukrainian side Chornomorets Odesa 4–1 on aggregate in the first round, and progressing in 2nd place from their group.

In the 2007–08 season, Shum managed Beitar Jerusalem for a year and was very successful by leading the team to a double. the Israeli Premier League championship and the Israeli State Cup, Making it the first time that Beitar Jerusalem took both of the titles in the same season.

In the 2009–10 season, Shum returned as Beitar Jerusalem manager, alongside the new assistant manager David Amsalem. On 26 January 2010 he won Toto Cup, but did not finish that season in his role. David Amsalem replaced him.

On 21 October 2010, Shum was appointed as the manager of Alki from the Cypriot First Division.

== Honours ==
=== As player ===
Hapoel Kfar Saba

- Israeli Premier League: 1981–82
- Israel State Cup: 1975, 1980

=== As manager ===
Hapoel Kfar Saba

- Israeli Second Division: 2001–02

Panathinaikos

- Super League Greece: 2003–04
- Greek Cup: 2004

Beitar Jerusalem

- Israeli Premier League: 2007–08
- Israel State Cup: 2008
- Toto Cup: 2010
