= Yehoshua Feigenbaum =

Israeli footballer (born 1947)

- Feigenbaum in 1970

Personal information
- Full name: Yehoshua Feigenbaum
- Date of birth: 5 December 1947 (age 78)
- Place of birth: Jaffa, Mandatory Palestine
- Height: 1.80 m (5 ft 11 in)
- Position: Striker

Senior career*
Years	Team	Apps	(Gls)
1964–1979	Hapoel Tel Aviv	440	(131)
1979–1980	Shimshon Tel Aviv	27	(10)
1980–1981	Hapoel Jerusalem	29	(5)
1981–1982	Hapoel Ramat Gan	36	(17)
1982–1983	Hapoel Haifa	21	(7)
1983	Beitar Ramla	10	(2)
Total		563	(172)

International career
1966–1977	Israel	50	(24)

Managerial career
- 1983–1984: Hapoel Haifa
- 1984–1986: Beitar Netanya
- 1987–1988: Hapoel Jerusalem
- 1988–1990: Maccabi Netanya
- 1990–1993: Hapoel Jerusalem
- 1993–1994: Hapoel Tel Aviv
- 1994–1995: Maccabi Petah Tikva
- 1995–1997: Maccabi Herzliya
- 1997–1998: Bnei Yehuda
- 1998–1999: Ironi Rishon LeZion
- 2000: Maccabi Herzliya
- 2001: Tzafririm Holon
- 2002: Hapoel Haifa
- 2003: Maccabi Ahi Nazareth
- 2003–2004: Hapoel Tel Aviv
- 2005: Hapoel Jerusalem
- 2006: Bnei Sakhnin
- 2006–2007: Hapoel Umm al-Fahm
- 2007–2008: Hapoel Ashkelon
- 2010: Hapoel Hadera
- 2011–2012: Ironi Ramat HaSharon
- 2013: Hapoel Kfar Saba
- * Club domestic league appearances and goals

Yehoshua "Shiye" Feigenbaum (Hebrew: יהושע "שייע" פייגנבוים; born 5 December 1947) is an Israeli former football player. As a striker, he holds many records with Israel national football team.

== Honours ==
=== As a Player ===
- Israeli Premier League (2):
  - 1965–66, 1968–69
- Israel State Cup (1):
  - 1972
- Asian Club Championship (1):
  - 1967

=== As a Manager ===
- Second Division (1):
  - 1985–86
- Toto Cup (1):
  - 1994–95
