= Cyprus national football team results (1990–2009) =

- Win Draw Loss

The Cyprus national football team represents Cyprus in association football and is controlled by the Cyprus Football Association (CFA), the governing body of the sport in the country.

The first match Cyprus played between 1990 and 2009 was a 4–2 defeat against Hungary. Their last match between 1990 and 2009 was a 3–2 defeat against Italy.

== Results ==
=== 1990 ===
| 31 October 1990 Euro 1992 qualifying | Hungary | 4–2 | Cyprus | Budapest, Hungary |
| 18:00 UTC+1 | Lőrincz 1', 19'; Kiprich 20' (pen.) 67' (pen.) | Report | Xiouroupas 13'; Tsolakis 89' | Stadium: Hungária körúti stadion Attendance: 2,204; Referee: Plarent Kotherja (Albania) |

| 14 November 1990 Euro 1992 qualifying | Cyprus | 0–3 | Norway | Nicosia, Cyprus |
| 19:00 UTC+2 | | Report | Sørloth 38'; Bohinen 49'; Brandhuag 62' | Stadium: Makario Stadium; Attendance: 2,123; Referee: Zoran Petrović (Yugoslavia) |

| 22 December 1990 Euro 1992 qualifying | Cyprus | 0–4 | Italy | Limassol, Cyprus |
| 15:00 UTC+2 | | Report | Serena 22', 50'; Vierchowod 15'; Lombardo 44' | Stadium: Tsirion Athletic Center; Attendance: 9,185; Referee: Ivan Gregr (Czechoslovakia) |

=== 1991 ===
| 27 February 1991 Friendly | Cyprus | 1–1 | Greece | Limassol, Cyprus |
| 15:30 UTC+2 | Nicolaou 48' | Report | Saravakos 9' | Stadium: Tsirion Athletic Center; Attendance: 1,625; Referee: Kyros Georgiou (Cyprus) |

| 3 April 1991 Euro 1992 qualifying | Cyprus | 0–2 | Hungary | Limassol, Cyprus |
| 15:00 UTC+3 | | Report | Szalma 15'; Kiprich 40' | Stadium: Tsirion Athletic Center; Attendance: 1,844; Referee: Gerhard Kapl (Austria) |

| 1 May 1991 Euro 1992 qualifying | Norway | 3–0 | Cyprus | Oslo, Norway |
| 19:00 UTC+2 | Lydersen 49' (pen.); Dahlum 65'; Sørloth 90' | Report | | Stadium: Ullevaal Stadion; Attendance: 7,833; Referee: Kaj Natri (Finland) |

| 29 May 1991 Euro 1992 qualifying | Soviet Union | 4–0 | Cyprus | Moscow, Soviet Union |
| 19:00 UTC+2 | Mostovoy 20'; Mykhaylychenko 51'; Korneev 87'; Aleinikov 89' | Report | | Stadium: Lenin Central Stadium; Attendance: 14,200; Referee: Ștefan Dan Petrescu (Romania) |

| 16 October 1991 Friendly | Cyprus | 1–1 | Iceland | Larnaca, Cyprus |
| 18:00 UTC+2 | Pittas 20' | Report | Örlygsson 46' | Stadium: GSZ Stadium; Attendance: 200; Referee: Loizos Loizou (Cyprus) |

| 13 November 1991 Euro 1992 qualifying | Cyprus | 0–3 | Soviet Union | Larnaca, Cyprus |
| 20:15 UTC+2 | | Report | Protasov 26'; Yuran 78'; Kanchelskis 81' | Stadium: GSZ Stadium; Attendance: 3,379; Referee: Andrew Waddell (Scotland) |

| 21 December 1991 Euro 1992 qualifying | Italy | 2–0 | Cyprus | Foggia, Italy |
| 14:30 UTC+2 | Vialli 28'; Baggio 55' | Report | | Stadium: Stadio Pino Zaccheria; Attendance: 16,353; Referee: Joaquín Ramos Marcos (Spain) |

=== 1992 ===
| 3 March 1992 Friendly | Israel | 2–1 | Cyprus | Bat Yam, Israel |
| 16:00 UTC+2 | Berkovic 27'; Cohen 39' | Report | Pittas 80' (pen.) | Stadium: Stadio Pino Zaccheria; Attendance: 2,700; Referee: Lajos Hartmann (Hungary) |

| 25 March 1992 Friendly | Cyprus | 1–3 | Greece | Limassol, Cyprus |
| 15:45 UTC+2 | Larkou 82' | Report | Toursounidis 7'; Karapialis 32'; Donis 84' | Stadium: Tsirion Athletic Center; Attendance: 2,500; Referee: Yaacov Scheiner (Israel) |

| 22 April 1992 1994 World Cup qualification | Belgium | 1–0 | Cyprus | Anderlecht, Belgium |
| 20:00 UTC+2 | Wilmots 24' | Report | | Stadium: Stade Constant Vanden Stock; Attendance: 15,314; Referee: Manuel Díaz Vega (Spain) |

| 16 June 1992 1994 World Cup qualification | Faroe Islands | 0–2 | Cyprus | Toftir, Faroe Islands |
| 19:00 UTC+1 | | Report | Sotiriou 30'; Papavasiliou 52' | Stadium: Svangaskarð; Attendance: 4,129; Referee: Leslie Irvine (Northern Ireland) |

| 2 September 1992 Friendly | Greece | 2–3 | Cyprus | Thessaloniki, Greece |
| 20:00 UTC+3 | Tsalouchidis 22'; Donis 78' | Report | Charalambous 5'; Sotiriou 37'; Andreou 85' (pen.) | Stadium: Kaftanzoglio Stadium; Attendance: 3,069; Referee: Stavros Zakestidis (Greece) |

| 7 October 1992 Friendly | Cyprus | 3–0 | Malta | Limassol, Cyprus |
| 19:00 UTC+2 | Hadjiloukas 52'; Costa 60'; Ioannou 74' | Report | | Stadium: Tsirion Athletic Center; Attendance: 1,000; Referee: Andreas Georgiou (Cyprus) |

| 14 October 1992 1994 World Cup qualification | Cyprus | 0–1 | Wales | Limassol, Cyprus |
| 18:00 UTC+2 | | Report | Hughes 51' | Stadium: Tsirion Athletic Center; Attendance: 12,000; Referee: László Vágner (Hungary) |

| 18 November 1992 Friendly | Cyprus | 1–1 | Slovenia | Larnaca, Cyprus |
| 14:30 UTC+2 | Savvidis 50' | Report | Miloševič 55' | Stadium: Antonis Papadopoulos Stadium; Attendance: 500; Referee: Loizos Loizou (Cyprus) |

| 29 November 1992 1994 World Cup qualification | Cyprus | 1–4 | Romania | Larnaca, Cyprus |
| 18:00 UTC+2 | Pittas 41' (pen.) | Report | Popescu 4'; Răducioiu 37'; Hagi 78'; Hanganu 87' | Stadium: Antonis Papadopoulos Stadium; Attendance: 3,000; Referee: Néji Jouini (Tunisia) |

| 22 December 1992 Friendly | Cyprus | 1–0 | Georgia | Limassol, Cyprus |
| 14:30 UTC+2 | Ioannou 40' | Report | | Stadium: Tsirion Athletic Center; Attendance: 2,500; Referee: Andreas Georgiou (Cyprus) |

=== 1993 ===
| 1 February 1993 Friendly | Cyprus | 0–0 | Poland | Nicosia, Cyprus |
| 14:30 UTC+2 | | Report | | Stadium: Makario Stadium; Attendance: 100; Referee: Loizos Loizou (Cyprus) |

| 13 February 1993 1994 World Cup qualification | Cyprus | 0–3 | Belgium | Nicosia, Cyprus |
| 19:00 UTC+2 | | Report | Scifo 2', 5'; Albert 87' | Stadium: Makario Stadium; Attendance: 1,500; Referee: Piero Ceccarini (Italy) |

| 24 March 1993 1994 World Cup qualification | Cyprus | 1–1 | Representation of Czechs and Slovaks | Limassol, Cyprus |
| 16:00 UTC+2 | Sotiriou 48' | Report | Moravčík 34' | Stadium: Tsirion Athletic Center; Attendance: 2,000; Referee: José Pratas (Portugal) |

| 14 April 1993 1994 World Cup qualification | Romania | 2–1 | Cyprus | Bucharest, Romania |
| 20:00 UTC+3 | Dumitrescu 23', 56' | Report | Sotiriou 56' | Stadium: Stadionul Steaua; Attendance: 17,000; Referee: Alfred Wieser (Austria) |

| 25 April 1993 1994 World Cup qualification | Cyprus | 3–1 | Faroe Islands | Limassol, Cyprus |
| 16:30 UTC+3 | Xiouroupas 8'; Sotiriou 42'; Ioannou 75' | Report | Arge 81' | Stadium: Tsirion Athletic Center; Attendance: 3,564; Referee: Haim Lipkovich (Israel) |

| 5 October 1993 Friendly | Cyprus | 2–2 | Israel | Limassol, Cyprus |
| 19:00 UTC+2 | Pittas 24'; Sotiriou 71' | Report | Harazi 33', 66' | Stadium: Tsirion Athletic Center; Attendance: 400; Referee: Loizos Loizou (Cyprus) |

| 13 October 1993 1994 World Cup qualification | Wales | 2–0 | Cyprus | Cardiff, Wales |
| 19:30 UTC+1 | Saunders 70'; Rush 86' | Report | | Stadium: Cardiff Arms Park; Attendance: 30,825; Referee: Philip Don (England) |

| 27 October 1993 1994 World Cup qualification | Representation of Czechs and Slovaks | 3–0 | Cyprus | Košice, Slovakia |
| 16:30 UTC+1 | Dubovský 12', 78'; Hapal 23' | Report | | Stadium: Všešportový areál Attendance: 15,602; Referee: Lyube Spasov (Bulgaria) |

=== 1994 ===
| 9 March 1994 Friendly | Cyprus | 2–0 | Estonia | Paralimni, Cyprus |
| 18:00 UTC+2 | Agathokelous 44'; Andreou 56' (pen.) | Report | | Stadium: Paralimni Stadium; Attendance: 700; Referee: Loizos Loizou (Cyprus) |

| 27 April 1994 Friendly | Slovenia | 3–0 | Cyprus | Maribor, Slovenia |
| 17:00 UTC+2 | Pate 44', 82'; Udovič 75' | Report | | Stadium: Stadion Ljudski Vrt; Attendance: 3,000; Referee: László Molnár (Hungary) |

| 7 September 1994 Euro 1996 qualifying | Cyprus | 1–2 | Spain | Limassol, Cyprus |
| 20:00 UTC+3 | Sotiriou 36' | Report | Higuera 17'; Charalambous 25' (o.g.) | Stadium: Tsirion Athletic Center; Attendance: 5,024; Referee: Marc Batta (France) |

| 8 October 1994 Euro 1996 qualifying | Armenia | 0–0 | Cyprus | Yerevan, Armenia |
| 20:00 UTC+3 | | Report | | Stadium: Hrazdan Stadium; Attendance: 3,600; Referee: Zbigniew Przesmycki (Poland) |

| 16 November 1994 Euro 1996 qualifying | Cyprus | 2–0 | Armenia | Limassol, Cyprus |
| 18:30 UTC+3 | Sotiriou 6'; Fasouliotis 85' | Report | | Stadium: Tsirion Athletic Center; Attendance: 3,254; Referee: Gerald Ashby (England) |

| 29 November 1994 Friendly | Israel | 4–3 | Cyprus | Jerusalem, Israel |
| 17:00 UTC+2 | Hazan 26', 37'; Harazi 39'; Rosenthal 76' | Report | Halfon 15' (o.g.); Gogić 33'; Hadjiloukas 55' | Stadium: Teddy Stadium; Attendance: 4,000; Referee: Daud Suheil (Israel) |

| 17 December 1994 Euro 1996 qualifying | Macedonia | 3–0 | Cyprus | Skopje, Macedonia |
| 17:30 UTC+1 | Đurovski 14', 25', 90' | Report | | Stadium: Gradski Stadion; Attendance: 13,000; Referee: Hartmut Strampe (Germany) |

=== 1995 ===
| 25 January 1995 Friendly | Cyprus | 2–3 | Greece | Larnaca, Cyprus |
| 18:00 UTC+2 | Gogić 8'; Kalitzakis 26' (og.) | Report | Georgiadis 36'; Frantzeskos 70'; Vryzas 82' | Stadium: Antonis Papadopoulos Stadium; Attendance: 2,000; Referee: Andreas Georgiou (Cyprus) |

| 8 February 1995 Friendly | Cyprus | 0–2 | Norway | Nicosia, Cyprus |
| 20:00 UTC+2 | | Report | Leonhardsen 21'; Flo 24' | Stadium: Makario Stadium; Attendance: 689; Referee: Amit Klein (Israel) |

| 15 February 1995 Friendly | Cyprus | 3–1 | Estonia | Limassol, Cyprus |
| 15:00 UTC+2 | Gogić 16'; Engomitis 83'; Larkou 85' | Report | Reim 76' (pen.) | Stadium: Tsirion Athletic Center; Attendance: 500; Referee: Michael Ioannou (Cyprus) |

| 8 March 1995 Friendly | Cyprus | 3–3 | Sweden | Limassol, Cyprus |
| 17:00 UTC+2 | Agathokleous 3'; Hadjiloukas 5'; Engomitis 85' | Report | Ekström 17'; Andersson 45'; Alexandersson 46' | Stadium: Tsirion Athletic Center; Attendance: 1,500; Referee: Tasos Papaioannou (Cyprus) |

| 29 March 1995 Euro 1996 qualifying | Cyprus | 1–1 | Denmark | Limassol, Cyprus |
| 20:00 UTC+3 | Agathokleous 45' | Report | Schjønberg 3' | Stadium: Tsirion Athletic Center; Attendance: 7,261; Referee: Brendan Shorte (Ireland) |

| 26 April 1995 Euro 1996 qualifying | Belgium | 2–0 | Cyprus | Brussels, Belgium |
| 20:15 UTC+2 | Karagiannis 20'; Schepens 46' | Report | | Stadium: Constant Vanden Stock Stadium; Attendance: 17,703; Referee: David Elleray (England) |

| 7 June 1995 Euro 1996 qualifying | Denmark | 4–0 | Cyprus | Copenhagen, Denmark |
| 19:15 UTC+2 | Vilfort 45', 51'; B. Laudrup 59'; M. Laudrup 75' | Report | | Stadium: Parken; Attendance: 40,282; Referee: Werner Müller (Switzerland) |

| 6 September 1995 Euro 1996 qualifying | Spain | 6–0 | Cyprus | Granada, Spain |
| 21:30 UTC+2 | Guerrero 45'; Pérez 50'; Pizzi 75', 84'; Hierro 83'; Caminero 85' | Report | | Stadium: Estadio Nuevo Los Cármenes; Attendance: 16,150; Referee: Dick Jol (Netherlands) |

| 11 October 1995 Euro 1996 qualifying | Cyprus | 1–1 | Macedonia | Limassol, Cyprus |
| 19:00 UTC+2 | Agathokleous 90' | Report | Jovanovski 34' | Stadium: Tsirion Athletic Center; Attendance: 4,513; Referee: Leslie Irvine (Northern Ireland) |

| 15 November 1995 Euro 1996 qualifying | Cyprus | 1–1 | Belgium | Limassol, Cyprus |
| 19:00 UTC+2 | Agathokleous 20' | Report | de Bilde 65' | Stadium: Tsirion Athletic Center; Attendance: 2,021; Referee: Graziano Cesari (Italy) |

=== 1996 ===
| 16 January 1996 Friendly | Lebanon | 1–0 | Cyprus | Beirut, Lebanon |
| 14:15 UTC+2 | Ghazarian 90' | Report | | Stadium: Bourj Hammoud Stadium; Attendance: 6,000; Referee: Talal Saleh (Lebanon) |

| 20 February 1996 Friendly | Cyprus | 1–0 | Estonia | Limassol, Cyprus |
| 15:15 UTC+2 | Constantinou 21' | Report | | Stadium: Tsirion Athletic Center; Attendance: 300; Referee: Kostas Kapitanis (Cyprus) |

| 12 March 1996 Friendly | Cyprus | 1–0 | Latvia | Larnaca, Cyprus |
| 15:30 UTC+2 | Agathokleous 47' | Report | | Stadium: GSZ Stadium; Attendance: 150; Referee: Giannakis Kyprianidis (Cyprus) |

| 27 March 1996 Friendly | Cyprus | 0–2 | Georgia | Limassol, Cyprus |
| 18:30 UTC+2 | | Report | Ketsbaia 53'; Jamarauli 65' | Stadium: Tsirion Athletic Center; Attendance: 2,000; Referee: Andreas Georgiou (Cyprus) |

| 5 June 1996 Friendly | Iceland | 2–1 | Cyprus | Akranes, Iceland |
| 20:00 (UTC+0:00) | Högnason 37'; Benediktsson 39' | Report | Alexandrou 61' | Stadium: Akranesvöllur; Attendance: 505; Referee: Niklas á Líðarenda (Faroe Islands) |

| 27 August 1996 Friendly | Poland | 2–2 | Cyprus | Bełchatów, Poland |
| 16:30 UTC+2 | Warzycha 47'; Mięciel 57' | Report | Alexandrou 76'; Malekkos 80' | Stadium: GIEKSA Arena; Attendance: 4,000; Referee: Pavlín Jirků (Czech Republic) |

| 1 September 1996 1998 World Cup qualification | Russia | 4–0 | Cyprus | Moscow, Russia |
| 19:00 (UTC+4:00) | Nikiforov 7', 50'; Kolyvanov 34'; Beschastnykh 82' | Report | | Stadium: Dynamo Stadium; Attendance: 8,500; Referee: Karl-Erik Nilsson (Sweden) |

| 8 October 1996 Friendly | Kuwait | 1–1 | Cyprus | Hawally, Kuwait |
| 21:30 UTC+2 | Al Saleh (?) | Report | Ioannou 8' | Stadium: Mohammed Al-Hamad Stadium; Attendance: 2,000; Referee: Salem Binhazim Saeed (United Arab Emirates) |

| 10 November 1996 1998 World Cup qualification | Cyprus | 2–0 | Israel | Limassol, Cyprus |
| 18:00 UTC+2 | Gogić 10', 14' (pen.) | Report | | Stadium: Tsirion Athletic Center; Attendance: 10,500; Referee: Gheorghe Constantin (Romania) |

| 14 December 1996 1998 World Cup qualification | Cyprus | 1–3 | Bulgaria | Limassol, Cyprus |
| 16:00 UTC+2 | Pittas 29' | Report | Kostadinov 23'; Balakov 34'; Iliev 70' | Stadium: Tsirion Athletic Center; Attendance: 6,314; Referee: John Rowbotham (Scotland) |

=== 1997 ===
| 14 February 1997 Cyprus International Tournament 1997 | Cyprus | 2–0 | Latvia | Paralimni, Cyprus |
| 15:15 UTC+2 | Georgiou 9'; Engomitis 20' | Report | | Stadium: Paralimni Stadium; Attendance: 4,000; Referee: Andreas Georgiou (Cyprus) |

| 15 February 1997 Cyprus International Tournament 1997 | Cyprus | 2–3 | Poland | Ayia Napa, Cyprus |
| 15:15 UTC+2 | Papavasiliou 63'; Charalambous 82' (pen.) | Report | Kucharski 11'; Sokołowski 18'; Kałużny 63' | Stadium: Municipal Stadium; Attendance: 300; Referee: Micheal Ioannou (Cyprus) |

| 17 February 1997 Cyprus International Tournament 1997 | Cyprus | 1–0 | Lithuania | Paralimni, Cyprus |
| 15:30 UTC+2 | Hadjiloukas 62' | Report | | Stadium: Paralimni Stadium; Attendance: 300; Referee: Loizos Loizou (Cyprus) |

| 12 March 1997 Friendly | Cyprus | 0–4 | Greece | Paralimni, Cyprus |
| 18:00 UTC+2 | | Report | Georgiadis 12'; Kostis 44'; Frantzeskos 53'; Alexandris 63' | Stadium: Paralimni Stadium; Attendance: 2,000; Referee: Andreas Georgiou (Cyprus) |

| 29 March 1997 1998 World Cup qualification | Cyprus | 1–1 | Russia | Paralimni, Cyprus |
| 18:30 UTC+2 | Gogić 31' | Report | Simutenkov 33' | Stadium: Paralimni Stadium; Attendance: 3,199; Referee: Juan Ansuátegui Roca (Spain) |

| 2 April 1997 1998 World Cup qualification | Bulgaria | 4–1 | Cyprus | Sofia, Bulgaria |
| 18:00 UTC+3 | Borimirov 2'; Kostadinov 35', 45'; Yordanov 66' | Report | Okkas 62' | Stadium: National Stadium Vasil Levski; Attendance: 28,000; Referee: Serge Muhmenthaler (Switzerland) |

| 30 April 1997 1998 World Cup qualification | Israel | 2–0 | Cyprus | Ramat Gan, Israel |
| 18:00 UTC+3 | Ohana 3', 72' | Report | | Stadium: National Stadium; Attendance: 32,000; Referee: Vasyl Melnychuk (Ukraine) |

| 19 August 1997 Friendly | Greece | 2–1 | Cyprus | Heraklion, Greece |
| | Machlas 21'; Gonias 73' (pen.) | Report | Malekkos 10' | Stadium: Theodoros Vardinogiannis Stadium; Attendance: 5,000; Referee: Spyros Papadakos (Greece) |

| 7 September 1997 1998 World Cup qualification | Luxembourg | 1–3 | Cyprus | Luxembourg, Luxembourg |
| 17:00 UTC+2 | Amodio 8' | Report | Papvasiliou 6'; Ioannou 55', 69' | Stadium: Stade Josy Barthel; Attendance: 3,022; Referee: Luxembourg (Iceland) |

| 11 October 1997 1998 World Cup qualification | Cyprus | 2–0 | Luxembourg | Limassol, Cyprus |
| 19:00 UTC+3 | Papavasiliou 80'; Špoljarić 85' | Report | | Stadium: Tsirion Athletic Center; Attendance: 5,000; Referee: Bujar Pregja (Albania) |

=== 1998 ===
| 5 February 1998 Cyprus International Tournament 1998 Group A | Cyprus | 1–1 | Finland | Limassol, Cyprus |
| 15:15 UTC+2 | Okkas 70' | Report | Johansson 30' | Stadium: Tsirion Athletic Center; Attendance: 2,500; Referee: Andreas Georgiou (Cyprus) |

| 5 February 1998 Cyprus International Tournament 1998 Semifinal (Note: The match is unofficial but listed by the Cyprus FA.) | Cyprus | 2–0 | Norway Olympic | Nicosia, Cyprus |
| 15:00 UTC+2 | Špoljarić 45'; Ioannou 62' | Report | | Stadium: Makario Stadium; Attendance: 2,500; Referee: Andreas Georgiou (Cyprus) |

| 9 February 1998 Cyprus International Tournament 1998 Final | Cyprus | 1–0 | Slovenia | Limassol, Cyprus |
| 15:00 UTC+2 | Kaifas 10' | Report | | Stadium: Tsirion Athletic Center; Attendance: 300; Referee: Micheal Ioannou (Cyprus) |

| 31 March 1998 Friendly | Cyprus | 4–0 | Estonia | Larnaca, Cyprus |
| 15:30 UTC+3 | Yiasoumi 73', 75', 86', 89' | Report | | Stadium: GSZ Stadium; Attendance: 500; Referee: Giannakis Kyprianidis (Cyprus) |

| 19 August 1998 Friendly | Cyprus | 3–2 | Albania | Nicosia, Cyprus |
| 20:00 UTC+3 | Engomitis 63'; Ioakeim 84'; D. Ioannou 90' | Report | Haxhi 60'; Bushi 61' | Stadium: Makario Stadium; Attendance: 500; Referee: Andreas Georgiou (Cyprus) |

| 5 September 1998 Euro 2000 qualifying | Cyprus | 3–2 | Spain | Larnaca, Cyprus |
| 21:00 UTC+2 | Engomitis 43'; Gogić 49'; Špoljarić 77' | Report | Raúl 73'; Morientes 90' | Stadium: Antonis Papadopoulos Stadium; Attendance: 1,876; Referee: Sergey Husainov (Russia) |

| 10 October 1998 Euro 2000 qualifying | Cyprus | 0–3 | Austria | Larnaca, Cyprus |
| 18:00 UTC+3 | | Report | Cerny 55', 61'; Reinmayr 71' | Stadium: Antonis Papadopoulos Stadium; Attendance: 5,679; Referee: Fernand Meese (Belgium) |

| 27 October 1998 Friendly | Cyprus | 5–3 | Kuwait | Paralimni, Cyprus |
| 14:45 UTC+2 | Nikolaou 48'; Dimitriou 50', 53', 61'; Yiasoumi 74' | Report | ? ? ? | Stadium: Paralimni Stadium; Referee: Tasos Papaioannou (Cyprus) |

| 18 November 1998 Euro 2000 qualifying | San Marino | 0–1 | Cyprus | Serravalle, San Marino |
| 20:30 UTC+1 | | Report | Špoljarić 41' | Stadium: Stadio Olimpico; Attendance: 511; Referee: John McDermott (Ireland) |

=== 1999 ===
| 3 February 1999 Cyprus International Tournament 1999 Semifinal | Cyprus | 0–1 | Belgium | Limassol, Cyprus |
| 21:00 UTC+2 | | Report | Mpenza 76' | Stadium: Tsirion Athletic Center; Attendance: 600; Referee: Loizos Loizou (Cyprus) |

| 5 February 1999 Cyprus International Tournament 1999 3rd Place Match | Cyprus | 2–1 (a.e.t.) | Finland | Paralimni, Cyprus |
| 18:00 UTC+2 | Karjalainen 40' (o.g.); Papavasiliou 100' | Report | Pohja 6' | Stadium: Paralimni Stadium; Attendance: 300; Referee: Andreas Georgiou (Cyprus) |

| 10 February 1999 Euro 2000 qualifying | Cyprus | 4–0 | San Marino | Limassol, Cyprus |
| 18:00 UTC+2 | Melanarkitis 18'; Konstantinou 32', 45'; Christodoulou 90' | Report | | Stadium: Tsirion Athletic Center; Attendance: 4,000; Referee: Roland Beck (Liechtenstein) |

| 16 March 1999 Friendly | Cyprus | 1–2 | Estonia | Paralimni, Cyprus |
| 15:45 UTC+2 | Christodoulou 81' | Report | Zelinski 59'; Terehhov 86' | Stadium: GSZ Stadium; Attendance: 200; Referee: Andreas Georgiou (Cyprus) |

| 28 March 1999 Euro 2000 qualifying | Israel | 3–0 | Cyprus | Ramat Gan, Israel |
| 19:00 UTC+2 | Banin 11'; Mizrahi 48', 52' | Report | | Stadium: National Stadium; Attendance: 32,000; Referee: Marcel Lică (Romania) |

| 18 August 1999 Friendly | Cyprus | 2–2 | Romania | Limassol, Cyprus |
| 18:00 UTC+3 | Malekkos 14'; Gogić 72' | Report | Lupescu 45' (pen.); Filipescu 75' | Stadium: Tsirion Athletic Center; Attendance: 1,500; Referee: Kostas Kapitanis (Cyprus) |

| 5 September 1999 Euro 2000 qualifying | Cyprus | 3–2 | Israel | Limassol, Cyprus |
| 20:00 UTC+3 | Engomitis 27'; Špoljarić 53', 87' (pen.) | Report | Badir 30'; Benayoun 81' | Stadium: Tsirion Athletic Center; Attendance: 14,000; Referee: Graham Barber (England) |

| 8 September 1999 Euro 2000 qualifying | Spain | 8–0 | Cyprus | Badajoz, Spain |
| 21:45 UTC+2 | Urzaiz 19', 25', 38'; Guerrero 34', 42', 56'; Martín 81'; Hierro 89' | Report | | Stadium: Estadio Nuevo Vivero; Attendance: 13,700; Referee: Alfredo Trentalange (Italy) |

| 10 October 1999 Euro 2000 qualifying | Austria | 3–1 | Cyprus | Vienna, Austria |
| 19:30 UTC+2 | Glieder 5'; Vastić 22'; Herzog 81' | Report | Costa 62' | Stadium: Ernst Happel Stadion; Attendance: 10,100; Referee: Livio Bazzoli (Italy) |

=== 2000 ===
| 2 February 2000 2000 Cyprus International Tournament Quarterfinal | Cyprus | 2–1 | Lithuania | Limassol, Cyprus |
| 14:30 UTC+2 | Konstantinou 60', 88' | Report | Fomenka 86' | Stadium: Tsirion Athletic Center; Attendance: 3,000; Referee: Romāns Lajuks (Latvia) |

| 4 February 2000 2000 Cyprus International Tournament Semifinal | Cyprus | 3–2 (a.e.t.) | Armenia | Strovolos, Cyprus |
| 21:00 UTC+2 | Melanarkitis 36'; Špoljarić 43', 114' | Report | Petrosyan 50'; Karamyan 74' | Stadium: Tsirion Athletic Center; Attendance: 600; Referee: Andreas Georgiou (Cyprus) |

| 6 February 2000 2000 Cyprus International Tournament Final | Cyprus | 3–2 (a.e.t.) | Romania | Strovolos, Cyprus |
| 14:30 UTC+2 | Okkas 5'; Poyiatzis 69'; Agathokleous 99' | Report | Mara 16'; Stoica 55' | Stadium: GSP Stadium; Attendance: 4,000; Referee: Giannakis Kyprianidis (Cyprus) |

| 22 March 2000 Friendly | Cyprus | 0–0 | Iran | Strovolos, Cyprus |
| 15:30 UTC+2 | | Report | | Stadium: GSP Stadium; Attendance: 500; Referee: Loizos Loizou (Cyprus) |

| 26 April 2000 Friendly | Romania | 2–0 | Cyprus | Constanţa, Romania |
| 17:00 UTC+3 | Mutu 58'; Ganea 80' (pen.) | Report | | Stadium: Stadionul Gheorghe Hagi; Attendance: 20,000; Referee: Marcel Lică (Romania) |

| 15 August 2000 Friendly | Albania | 0–0 | Cyprus | Tirana, Albania |
| 19:00 UTC+2 | | Report | | Stadium: Qemal Stafa Stadium; Attendance: 4,000; Referee: Sašo Lazarevski (Macedonia) |

| 2 September 2000 2002 World Cup qualification | Andorra | 2–3 | Cyprus | Andorra la Vella, Andorra |
| 17:30 UTC+2 | González 45'; I. Lima 51' | Report | Konstantinou 25', 90'; Agathokleous 77' | Stadium: Estadi Comunal d'Andorra la Vella; Attendance: 600; Referee: Ihor Yarmenchuk (Ukraine) |

| 7 October 2000 2002 World Cup qualification | Cyprus | 0–4 | Netherlands | Strovolos, Cyprus |
| 20:30 UTC+3 | | Report | Seedorf 68', 78'; Overmars 81'; Kluivert 90' | Stadium: GSP Stadium; Attendance: 10,250; Referee: Graziano Cesari (Italy) |

| 15 November 2000 2002 World Cup qualification | Cyprus | 5–0 | Andorra | Limassol, Cyprus |
| 19:00 UTC+2 | Okkas 10', 18'; Agathokleous 42', 74'; Špoljarić 90' (pen.) | Report | | Stadium: Tsirion Athletic Center; Attendance: 1,193; Referee: Sten Johanzon (Sweden) |

=== 2001 ===
| 26 February 2001 Cyprus International Tournament 2001 Semifinal | Cyprus | 1–2 | Lithuania | Limassol, Cyprus |
| 21:00 UTC+2 | Yiasoumi 29' | Report | Danilevičius 83'; Poškus 87' | Stadium: Tsirion Athletic Center; Attendance: 1,000; Referee: Giannakis Kyprianidis (Cyprus) |

| 28 February 2001 Cyprus International Tournament 2001 3rd Place Match | Cyprus | 4–3 (a.e.t.) | Ukraine | Larnaca, Cyprus |
| 15:30 UTC+2 | Okkas 17'; Engomitis 39'; Malekkos 81'; Charalambous 104' | Report | Melashchenko 9'; Vorobey 57', 63' | Stadium: GSZ Stadium; Attendance: 1,000; Referee: Andreas Georgiou (Cyprus) |

| 24 March 2001 2002 World Cup qualification | Cyprus | 0–4 | Republic of Ireland | Strovolos, Cyprus |
| 20:00 UTC+2 | | Report | Keane 33', 89'; Harte 42' (pen.); Kelly 81' | Stadium: GSP Stadium; Attendance: 8,854; Referee: Frank De Bleeckere (Belgium) |

| 28 March 2001 2002 World Cup qualification | Cyprus | 2–2 | Estonia | Limassol, Cyprus |
| 19:00 UTC+3 | Konstantinou 48'; Okkas 67' | Report | Kristal 77'; Piiroja 78' | Stadium: Tsirion Athletic Center; Attendance: 3,000; Referee: Tomasz Mikulski (Poland) |

| 25 April 2001 2002 World Cup qualification | Netherlands | 4–0 | Cyprus | Eindhoven, Netherlands |
| 20:30 UTC+2 | Hasselbaink 29'; Overmars 35'; Kluivert 44'; Nistelrooy 82' | Report | | Stadium: Philips Stadion; Attendance: 31,000; Referee: Yuriy Baskakov (Russia) |

| 6 June 2001 2002 World Cup qualification | Portugal | 6–0 | Cyprus | Lisbon, Portugal |
| 18:00 UTC+3 | Pauleta 36', 71'; Barbosa 55', 59'; Pinto 76', 81' | Report | | Stadium: Estádio José Alvalade; Attendance: 34,500; Referee: Stefano Farina (Italy) |

| 15 August 2001 2002 World Cup qualification | Estonia | 2–2 | Cyprus | Tallinn, Estonia |
| 19:00 UTC+2 | Zelinski 51'; Novikov 86' | Report | | Stadium: Lilleküla Staadion; Attendance: 5,000; Referee: Aleh Chikun (Belarus) |

| 5 September 2001 2002 World Cup qualification | Cyprus | 1–3 | Portugal | Larnaca, Cyprus |
| 20:30 UTC+3 | Konstantinou 24' | Report | Gomes 47'; Pauleta 65'; Conceição 71' | Stadium: Antonis Papadopoulos Stadium; Attendance: 2,878; Referee: Karl-Erik Nilsson (Sweden) |

| 6 October 2001 2002 World Cup qualification | Republic of Ireland | 4–0 | Cyprus | Dublin, Ireland |
| 18:00 UTC+1 | Harte 3'; Quinn 11'; Connolly 63'; Keane 67' | Report | | Stadium: Lansdowne Road; Attendance: 30,000; Referee: Juan Ansuátegui Roca (Spain) |

| 14 November 2001 Friendly | Greece | 1–2 | Cyprus | Athens, Greece |
| 17:15 UTC+2 | Lyberopoulos 86' | Report | Okkas 41'; Ioakim 88' | Stadium: Municipal Stadium Kaisariani; Attendance: 1,500; Referee: Juan Ansuátegui Roca (Czech Republic) |

=== 2002 ===
| 12 February 2002 Cyprus International Tournament 2002 Semifinal | Cyprus | 1–1 (a.e.t.) (4–2 p) | Switzerland | Nicosia, Cyprus |
| 17:00 UTC+2 | Konstantinou 21' | Report | Yakin 32' | Stadium: Makario Stadium; Attendance: 100; Referee: Nikos Agelakis (Greece) |

| 13 February 2002 Cyprus International Tournament 2002 Final | Cyprus | 3–4 | Czech Republic | Strovolos, Cyprus |
| 19:00 UTC+2 | Yiasoumi 24'; Ioakim 65'; Konstantinou 88' | Report | Lokvenc 51'; Koller 74', 86'; Šmicer 88' | Stadium: GSP Stadium; Attendance: 450; Referee: Panikos Kailis (Cyprus) |

| 15 May 2002 Friendly | Greece | 3–1 | Cyprus | Rhodes, Greece |
| 18:30 UTC+3 | Fyssas 28', 33'; Amanatidis 79' | Report | Nikolaou 5' | Stadium: Diagoras Stadium; Attendance: 2,000; Referee: Juan Antonio Fernández Marín (Spain) |

| 21 August 2002 Friendly | Northern Ireland | 0–0 | Cyprus | Belfast, Northern Ireland |
| 20:00 UTC+1 | | Report | | Stadium: Windsor Park; Attendance: 6,922; Referee: Simon Jones (Wales) |

| 7 September 2002 Euro 2004 qualifying | Cyprus | 1–2 | France | Strovolos, Cyprus |
| 20:30 UTC+2 | Okkas 14' | Report | Cissé 39'; Wiltord 52' | Stadium: GSP Stadium; Attendance: 11,898; Referee: Herbert Fandel (Germany) |

| 20 November 2002 Euro 2004 qualifying | Cyprus | 2–1 | Malta | Strovolos, Cyprus |
| 19:00 UTC+2 | Rauffmann 50'; Okkas 74' | Report | Mifsud 90' | Stadium: GSP Stadium; Attendance: 6,000; Referee: Stefano Farina (Italy) |

=== 2003 ===
| 29 January 2003 Friendly | Cyprus | 1–2 | Greece | Larnaca, Cyprus |
| 17:30 UTC+2 | Konstantinou 27' (pen.) | Report | Fyssas 53'; Choutos 70' | Stadium: GSZ Stadium; Attendance: 8,854; Referee: Loizos Loizou (Cyprus) |

| 12 February 2003 Cyprus International Tournament 2003 Semifinal | Cyprus | 0–1 | Russia | Limassol, Cyprus |
| 21:00 UTC+2 | | Report | Khokhlov 44' | Stadium: Tsirion Athletic Center; Attendance: 400; Referee: Makis Efthimiadis (Greece) |

| 13 February 2003 Cyprus International Tournament 2003 3rd Place Match | Cyprus | 1–3 | Slovakia | Larnaca, Cyprus |
| 16:00 UTC+2 | Rauffmann 39' | Report | Reiter 1'; Vittek 62', 84' | Stadium: GSZ Stadium; Attendance: 200; Referee: Kostas Kapitanis (Cyprus) |

| 29 March 2003 Euro 2004 qualifying | Cyprus | 1–1 | Israel | Limassol, Cyprus |
| 19:00 UTC+2 | Rauffmann 60' | Report | Afek 2' | Stadium: Tsirion Athletic Center; Attendance: 3,000; Referee: Mike McCurry (Scotland) |

| 2 April 2003 Euro 2004 qualifying | Slovenia | 4–1 | Cyprus | Ljubljana, Slovenia |
| 20:15 UTC+2 | Šiljak 4', 14'; Zahovič 38' (pen.); Čeh 43' | Report | Konstantinou 10' | Stadium: Centralni Stadion Bežigrad; Attendance: 4,000; Referee: Paulo Manuel Gomes Costa (Portugal) |

| 30 April 2003 Euro 2004 qualifying | Israel | 2–0 | Cyprus | Palermo, Italy |
| 21:30 UTC+3 | Badir 88'; Holtzman 90+5' | Report | | Stadium: Stadio Renzo Barbera; Attendance: 300; Referee: Michal Beneš (Czech Republic) |
Note: Israel were forced to play all home games away from Israel due to the ongoing violence regarding the Israeli–Palestinian conflict.

| 7 June 2003 Euro 2004 qualifying | Malta | 1–2 | Cyprus | Ta' Qali, Malta |
| 19:00 UTC+2 | Dimech 72' | Report | Konstantinou 23' (pen.), 52' | Stadium: Ta' Qali National Stadium; Attendance: 1,607; Referee: Bernhard Brugger (Austria) |

| 6 September 2003 Euro 2004 qualifying | France | 5–0 | Cyprus | Saint-Denis, France |
| 20:45 UTC+2 | Trezeguet 7', 80'; Wiltord 19', 40'; Henry 59' | Report | | Stadium: Stade de France; Attendance: 50,132; Referee: Leslie Irvine (Northern Ireland) |

| 11 October 2003 Euro 2004 qualifying | Cyprus | 2–2 | Slovenia | Limassol, Cyprus |
| 19:30 UTC+3 | Georgiou 71'; Yiasoumi 82' | Report | Šiljak 12', 42' | Stadium: Tsirion Athletic Center; Attendance: 242; Referee: Tom Henning Øvrebø (Norway) |

=== 2004 ===
| 18 February 2004 Cyprus International Football Tournament 2004 Quarterfinal | Cyprus | 0–2 | Belarus | Achna, Cyprus |
| 15:00 UTC+2 | | Report | Ramashchanka 56', 70' | Stadium: Dasaki Stadium; Attendance: 250; Referee: Panikos Kailis (Cyprus) |

| 19 February 2004 Cyprus International Football Tournament 2004 Semifinal | Cyprus | 3–1 | Georgia | Nicosia, Cyprus |
| 15:00 UTC+2 | Charalambidis 45', 55'; Elia 73' | Report | Gabidauri 56' | Stadium: Makario Stadium; Attendance: 1,500; Referee: Sergey Kapanin (Kazakhstan) |

| 21 February 2004 Cyprus International Football Tournament 2004 5th Place Match | Cyprus | 2–1 | Kazakhstan | Limassol, Cyprus |
| 15:00 UTC+2 | Charalambidis 2'; Michael 9' | Report | Uzdenov 70' | Stadium: Tsirion Athletic Center; Attendance: 300; Referee: Romāns Lajuks (Latvia) |

| 19 May 2004 Friendly | Cyprus | 0–0 | Jordan | Larnaca, Cyprus |
| 18:00 UTC+3 | | Report | | Stadium: GSZ Stadium; Attendance: 2,500; Referee: Loizos Loizou (Cyprus) |

| 18 August 2004 Friendly | Cyprus | 2–1 | Albania | Limassol, Cyprus |
| 20:00 UTC+3 | Konstantinou 18' (pen.), 48' | Report | Rraklli 64' | Stadium: Tsirion Athletic Center; Attendance: 200; Referee: Kostas Kapitanis (Cyprus) |

| 4 September 2004 2006 World Cup qualification | Republic of Ireland | 3–0 | Cyprus | Dublin, Ireland |
| 15:00 UTC+1 | Morrison 33'; Reid 38'; Keane 55' | Report | | Stadium: Lansdowne Road; Attendance: 35,900; Referee: Levan Paniashvili (Georgia) |

| 8 September 2004 2006 World Cup qualification | Israel | 2–1 | Cyprus | Ramat Gan, Israel |
| 20:50 UTC+3 | Benayoun 64'; Badir 75' | Report | Konstantinou 59' | Stadium: National Stadium; Attendance: 21,872; Referee: Syarhey Shmolik (Belarus) |

| 9 October 2004 2006 World Cup qualification | Cyprus | 2–2 | Faroe Islands | Strovolos, Cyprus |
| 20:00 UTC+3 | Konstantinou 14' (pen.); Okkas 82' | Report | Jørgensen 21'; Jacobsen 43' | Stadium: GSP Stadium; Attendance: 2,043; Referee: Zöhrab Qədiyev (Azerbaijan) |

| 13 October 2004 2006 World Cup qualification | Cyprus | 0–2 | France | Strovolos, Cyprus |
| 21:45 UTC+3 | | Report | Wiltord 38'; Henry 72' | Stadium: GSP Stadium; Attendance: 3,319; Referee: Claus Bo Larsen (Denmark) |

| 17 November 2004 2006 World Cup qualification | Cyprus | 1–2 | Israel | Strovolos, Cyprus |
| 21:45 UTC+3 | Okkas 45' | Report | Keisi 17'; Nimni 86' | Stadium: GSP Stadium; Attendance: 1,624; Referee: Sten Kaldma (Estonia) |

=== 2005 ===
| 8 February 2005 Cyprus International Tournament 2005 Semifinal | Cyprus | 1–1 (a.e.t.) (5–4 p) | Austria | Limassol, Cyprus |
| 18:45 UTC+2 | Charalambidis 90+1' | Report | Kirchler 43' | Stadium: Tsirion Athletic Center; Attendance: 300; Referee: Jouni Hyytiä (Finland) |

| 9 February 2005 Cyprus International Tournament 2005 Final | Cyprus | 1–2 | Finland | Strovolos, Cyprus |
| 18:45 UTC+2 | Michael 24' | Report | Roiha 66', 70' | Stadium: GSP Stadium; Attendance: 1,502; Referee: Romāns Lajuks (Latvia) |

| 26 March 2005 Friendly | Cyprus | 2–1 | Jordan | Larnaca, Cyprus |
| | Charalambidis 9'; Okkas 28' | Report | Shelbaieh 85' | Stadium: GSZ Stadium; Referee: Frank De Bleeckere (Belgium) |

| 30 March 2005 2006 World Cup qualification | Switzerland | 1–0 | Cyprus | Zürich, Switzerland |
| 20:30 UTC+2 | Frei 88' | Report | | Stadium: Hardturm; Attendance: 16,066; Referee: Stuart Dougal (Scotland) |

| 13 August 2005 Friendly | Cyprus | 2–1 | Iraq | Limassol, Cyprus |
| | Yiasoumi 63', 79' | Report | Shakroun 17' | Stadium: Tsirion Athletic Center; Attendance: 500; Referee: Panikos Kailis (Cyprus) |

| 17 August 2005 2006 World Cup qualification | Faroe Islands | 0–3 | Cyprus | Toftir, Faroe Islands |
| 19:00 UTC+1 | | Report | Konstantinou 39', 77' (pen.); Krassas 90+' | Stadium: Svangaskarð; Attendance: 2,720; Referee: Stefan Johannesson (Sweden) |

| 7 September 2005 2006 World Cup qualification | Cyprus | 1–3 | Switzerland | Strovolos, Cyprus |
| 21:15 UTC+3 | Aloneftis 35' | Report | Frei 15'; Senderos 69'; Gygax 84' | Stadium: GSP Stadium; Attendance: 2,561; Referee: Nikolay Ivanov (Russia) |

| 8 October 2005 2006 World Cup qualification | Cyprus | 0–1 | Republic of Ireland | Strovolos, Cyprus |
| 20:00 UTC+3 | | Report | Elliott 6' | Stadium: GSP Stadium; Attendance: 13,546; Referee: Viktor Kassai (Hungary) |

| 12 October 2005 2006 World Cup qualification | France | 4–0 | Cyprus | Saint-Denis, France |
| 20:45 UTC+2 | Zidane 28'; Wiltord 32'; Dhorasoo 48'; Giuly 84' | Report | | Stadium: Stade de France; Attendance: 78,864; Referee: Wolfgang Stark ([Germany) |

| 16 November 2005 Friendly | Cyprus | 1–0 | Wales | Limassol, Cyprus |
| 21:00 UTC+2 | Michael 42' (pen.) | Report | | Stadium: Tsirion Athletic Center; Attendance: 1,000; Referee: Haim Yaacov (Israel) |

=== 2006 ===
| 28 February 2006 Cyprus International Tournament 2006 Semifinal | Cyprus | 0–1 | Slovenia | Larnaca, Cyprus |
| 17:00 UTC+2 | | Report | Ljubijankič 85' | Stadium: Antonis Papadopoulos Stadium; Attendance: 1,000; Referee: Tony Asumaa (Finland) |

| 1 March 2006 Cyprus International Tournament 2006 3rd Place Match | Cyprus | 2–0 | Armenia | Limassol, Cyprus |
| 17:00 UTC+2 | Okkas 18'; Michael 61' | Report | | Stadium: Tsirion Athletic Center; Attendance: 2,000; Referee: Mircea Salomir (Romania) |

| 16 August 2006 Friendly | Romania | 2–0 | Cyprus | Constanţa, Romania |
| 20:00 UTC+3 | Dică 4'; Mutu 29' | Report | | Stadium: Stadionul Farul; Attendance: 10,000; Referee: Sorin Corpodean (Romania) |

| 2 September 2006 Euro 2008 qualifying | Slovakia | 6–1 | Cyprus | Bratislava, Slovakia |
| 20:15 UTC+2 | Škrtel 9'; Mintál 33', 55'; Šebo 43', 48'; Karhan 52' | Report | Yiasoumi 90' | Stadium: Tehelné pole Attendance: 4,323; Referee: Oleh Oriekhov (Ukraine) |

| 7 October 2006 Euro 2008 qualifying | Cyprus | 5–2 | Republic of Ireland | Strovolos, Cyprus |
| 17:00 UTC+3 | Konstantinou 10', 51' (pen.); Garpozis 16'; Charalambidis 60', 75' | Report | Ireland 7'; Dunne 43' | Stadium: GSP Stadium; Attendance: 7,000; Referee: Lucílio Batista (Portugal) |

| 11 October 2006 Euro 2008 qualifying | Wales | 3–1 | Cyprus | Cardiff, Wales |
| 21:15 UTC+3 | Koumas 33'; Earnshaw 39'; Bellamy 72' | Report | Okkas 83' | Stadium: Millennium Stadium; Attendance: 20,456; Referee: Jacek Granat (Poland) |

| 16 November 2006 Euro 2008 qualifying | Cyprus | 1–1 | Germany | Strovolos, Cyprus |
| 21:00 UTC+2 | Okkas 43' | Report | Ballack 15' | Stadium: GSP Stadium; Attendance: 12,300; Referee: Peter Fröjdfeldt (Sweden) |

=== 2007 ===
| 6 February 2007 Cyprus International Tournament 2007 Semifinal | Cyprus | 2–1 | Hungary | Limassol, Cyprus |
| 19:00 UTC+2 | Yiasoumi 18'; Okkas 73' | Report | Priskin 89' | Stadium: Tsirion Athletic Center; Attendance: 200; Referee: Panagiotis Gerasimou (Cyprus) |

| 7 February 2007 Cyprus International Tournament 2007 3rd Place Match | Cyprus | 0–3 | Bulgaria | Strovolos, Cyprus |
| 19:00 UTC+2 | | Report | Berbatov 45' (pen.), 87'; Georgiev 68' | Stadium: GSP Stadium; Attendance: 680; Referee: Leontios Trattou (Cyprus) |

| 24 March 2007 Euro 2008 qualifying | Cyprus | 1–3 | Slovakia | Strovolos, Cyprus |
| 19:00 UTC+2 | Alonefits 45' | Report | Vittek 54'; Škrtel 67'; Jakubko 77' | Stadium: GSP Stadium; Attendance: 2,696; Referee: Gerald Lehner (Austria) |

| 28 March 2007 Euro 2008 qualifying | Czech Republic | 1–0 | Cyprus | Liberec, Czech Republic |
| 17:25 UTC+2 | Kováč 20' | Report | | Stadium: Stadion u Nisy; Attendance: 9,310; Referee: Ivan Bebek (Croatia) |

| 22 August 2007 Euro 2008 qualifying | San Marino | 0–1 | Cyprus | Serravalle, San Marino |
| 21:00 UTC+2 | | Report | Okkas 54' | Stadium: Stadio Olimpico; Attendance: 552; Referee: Albano Janku (Albania) |

| 8 September 2007 Friendly | Cyprus | 3–1 | Armenia | Achna, Cyprus |
| 20:00 UTC+3 | Michael 31'; Okkas 42'; Konstantinou 52' | Report | Arzumanyan 35' | Stadium: Dasaki Stadium; Attendance: 500; Referee: Leontios Trattou (Cyprus) |

| 12 September 2007 Euro 2008 qualifying | Cyprus | 3–0 | San Marino | Strovolos, Cyprus |
| 20:00 UTC+3 | Makridis 15'; Alonefits 41', 90+2' | Report | | Stadium: GSP Stadium; Attendance: 600; Referee: Aleksei Kulbakov (Belarus) |

| 13 October 2007 Euro 2008 qualifying | Cyprus | 3–1 | Wales | Strovolos, Cyprus |
| 19:30 UTC+3 | Okkas 59', 68'; Charalambidis 79' | Report | Collins 21' | Stadium: GSP Stadium; Attendance: 3,862; Referee: Carlo Bertolini (Switzerland) |

| 17 October 2007 Euro 2008 qualifying | Republic of Ireland | 1–1 | Cyprus | Dublin, Ireland |
| 19:30 UTC+1 | Finnan 90+3' | Report | Okkaridis 80' | Stadium: Croke Park; Attendance: 54,861; Referee: Mikko Vuorela (Finland) |

| 17 November 2007 Euro 2008 qualifying | Germany | 4–0 | Cyprus | Hannover, Germany |
| 20:00 UTC+1 | Fritz 2'; Klose 20'; Podolski 53'; Hitzlsperger 82' | Report | | Stadium: A.W.D. Arena; Attendance: 45,016; Referee: Peter Rasmussen (Denmark) |

| 21 November 2007 Euro 2008 qualifying | Cyprus | 0–2 | Czech Republic | Strovolos, Cyprus |
| 18:30 UTC+2 | | Report | Pudil 11'; Koller 74' | Stadium: GSP Stadium; Attendance: 5,886; Referee: Levan Paniashvili (Georgia) |

=== 2008 ===
| 6 February 2008 Friendly | Cyprus | 1–1 | Ukraine | Strovolos, Cyprus |
| 18:00 UTC+2 | Aloneftis 19' (pen.) | Report | Milevskyi 71' | Stadium: GSP Stadium; Attendance: 1,000; Referee: Giorgos Kasnaferis (Greece) |

| 19 May 2008 Friendly | Greece | 2–0 | Cyprus | Patras, Cyprus |
| 21:15 UTC+3 | Ninis 5'; Katsouranis 59' (pen.) | Report | | Stadium: Pampeloponnisiako Stadium; Attendance: 16,216; Referee: Dougie McDonald (Scotland) |

| 20 August 2008 Friendly | Switzerland | 4–1 | Cyprus | Lancy, Switzerland |
| 20:45 UTC+2 | Stocker 8'; Yakin 26'; Nef 72'; Vonlanthen 81' | Report | Makridis 34' | Stadium: Stade de Genève; Attendance: 14,500; Referee: Darko Čeferin (Slovenia) |

| 6 September 2008 2010 World Cup qualification | Cyprus | 1–2 | Italy | Larnaca, Cyprus |
| 21:45 UTC+3 | Alonefits 29' | Report | Di Natale 8', 90+2' | Stadium: Antonis Papadopoulos Stadium; Attendance: 6,000; Referee: Pieter Vink (Netherlands) |

| 11 October 2008 2010 World Cup qualification | Georgia | 1–1 | Cyprus | Tbilisi, Georgia |
| 20:30 UTC+4 | Kobiashvili 73' | Report | Konstantinou 67' | Stadium: Boris Paichadze National Stadium; Attendance: 42,000; Referee: Radek Matějek (Czech Republic) |

| 15 October 2008 2010 World Cup qualification | Republic of Ireland | 1–0 | Cyprus | Dublin, Ireland |
| 19:45 UTC+1 | Keane 5' | Report | | Stadium: Croke Park; Attendance: 55,833; Referee: Alexandru Deaconu (Romania) |

| 19 November 2008 Friendly | Cyprus | 2–1 | Belarus | Strovolos, Cyprus |
| 19:00 UTC+2 | Christofi 29'; Avraam 46' | Report | Kovel 55' | Stadium: GSP Stadium; Attendance: 800; Referee: Asaf Kenan (Israel) |

=== 2009 ===
| 10 February 2009 Cyprus International Tournament 2009 Semifinal | Cyprus | 0–2 | Serbia | Strovolos, Cyprus |
| 19:00 UTC+2 | | Report | Jovanović 25'; Lazović 42' | Stadium: GSP Stadium; Attendance: 250; Referee: Tasos Kakos (Greece) |

| 11 February 2009 Cyprus International Tournament 2009 3rd Place Match | Cyprus | 3–2 | Slovakia | Nicosia, Cyprus |
| 19:00 UTC+2 | Marangos 32' (pen.); Nikolaou 74'; Okkas 82' | Report | Jež 88'; Jendrišek 90+3' | Stadium: Makario Stadium; Attendance: 300; Referee: Vasilis Pamboridis (Greece) |

| 28 March 2009 2010 World Cup qualification | Cyprus | 2–1 | Georgia | Larnaca, Cyprus |
| 20:00 UTC+2 | Konstantinou 33'; Christofi 56' | Report | Kobiashvili 71' (pen.) | Stadium: Antonis Papadopoulos Stadium; Attendance: 1,151; Referee: Fredy Fautrel (France) |

| 30 May 2009 Friendly | Cyprus | 0–1 | Canada | Larnaca, Cyprus |
| 20:00 UTC+3 | | Report | Jackson 53' | Stadium: Antonis Papadopoulos Stadium; Attendance: 250; Referee: Asaf Kenan (Israel) |

| 6 June 2009 2010 World Cup qualification | Cyprus | 2–2 | Montenegro | Larnaca, Cyprus |
| 20:30 UTC+3 | Konstantinou 14'; Michael 45' (pen.) | Report | Damjanovoć 65', 79' | Stadium: Antonis Papadopoulos Stadium; Attendance: 3,000; Referee: Carlos Velasco Carballo (Spain) |

| 12 August 2009 Friendly | Albania | 6–1 | Cyprus | Tirana, Albania |
| 19:00 UTC+2 | Skela 26' (pen.), 44' (pen.); Bogdani 65'; Duro 68'; Agolli 71'; Vila 75' | Report | Charalambidis 37' | Stadium: Qemal Stafa Stadium; Attendance: 2,500; Referee: Bülent Yıldırım (Turkey) |

| 5 September 2009 2010 World Cup qualification | Cyprus | 1–2 | Republic of Ireland | Strovolos, Cyprus |
| 21:30 UTC+3 | Elia 30' | Report | Doyle 5'; Keane 83' | Stadium: GSP Stadium; Attendance: 3,691; Referee: Thomas Einwaller (Austria) |

| 9 September 2009 2010 World Cup qualification | Montenegro | 1–1 | Cyprus | Podgorica, Montenegro |
| 20:15 UTC+2 | Vučinić 56' (pen.) | Report | Okkas 63' | Stadium: Stadion Pod Goricom; Attendance: 4,000; Referee: Cyril Zimmermann (Switzerland) |

| 10 October 2009 2010 World Cup qualification | Cyprus | 4–1 | Bulgaria | Larnaca, Cyprus |
| 20:00 UTC+2 | Charalambidis 11', 20'; Konstantinou 58'; Aloneftis 78' | Report | Berbatov 45' | Stadium: Antonis Papadopoulos Stadium; Attendance: 78,864; Referee: Wolfgang Stark (Germany) |

| 14 October 2009 2010 World Cup qualification | Italy | 3–2 | Cyprus | Parma, Italy |
| 20:00 UTC+2 | Gilardino 78', 81', 90+2' | Report | Okkas 13'; Michael 48' | Stadium: Stadio Ennio Tardini; Attendance: 15,009; Referee: Alon Yefet (Israel) |

== Record by opponent ==
| Team | Pld | W | D | L | GF | GA | GD | WPCT |
|---|---|---|---|---|---|---|---|---|
| Albania | 4 | 2 | 1 | 1 | 6 | 9 | −3 | 50.00 |
| Andorra | 2 | 2 | 0 | 0 | 8 | 2 | +6 | 100.00 |
| Armenia | 5 | 4 | 1 | 0 | 10 | 3 | +7 | 80.00 |
| Austria | 3 | 0 | 1 | 2 | 2 | 7 | −5 | 0.00 |
| Belarus | 2 | 1 | 0 | 1 | 2 | 3 | −1 | 50.00 |
| Belgium | 5 | 0 | 1 | 4 | 1 | 8 | −7 | 0.00 |
| Bulgaria | 4 | 1 | 0 | 3 | 6 | 11 | −5 | 25.00 |
| Canada | 1 | 0 | 0 | 1 | 0 | 1 | −1 | 0.00 |
| Czech Republic | 3 | 1 | 0 | 2 | 6 | 6 | 0 | 33.33 |
| Czechoslovakia | 2 | 0 | 1 | 1 | 1 | 4 | −3 | 0.00 |
| Denmark | 2 | 0 | 1 | 1 | 1 | 5 | −4 | 0.00 |
| Estonia | 7 | 4 | 2 | 1 | 15 | 7 | +8 | 57.14 |
| Faroe Islands | 4 | 3 | 1 | 0 | 10 | 3 | +7 | 75.00 |
| Finland | 3 | 1 | 1 | 1 | 4 | 4 | 0 | 33.33 |
| France | 4 | 0 | 0 | 4 | 1 | 13 | −12 | 0.00 |
| Georgia | 5 | 3 | 1 | 1 | 7 | 5 | +2 | 60.00 |
| Germany | 2 | 0 | 1 | 1 | 1 | 5 | −4 | 0.00 |
| Greece | 10 | 2 | 1 | 7 | 12 | 23 | −11 | 20.00 |
| Hungary | 3 | 1 | 0 | 2 | 4 | 7 | −3 | 33.33 |
| Iceland | 2 | 0 | 1 | 1 | 2 | 3 | −1 | 0.00 |
| Iran | 1 | 0 | 1 | 0 | 0 | 0 | 0 | 0.00 |
| Iraq | 1 | 1 | 0 | 0 | 2 | 1 | +1 | 100.00 |
| Republic of Ireland | 8 | 1 | 1 | 6 | 7 | 18 | −11 | 12.50 |
| Israel | 11 | 2 | 2 | 7 | 14 | 22 | −8 | 18.18 |
| Italy | 4 | 0 | 0 | 4 | 3 | 11 | −8 | 0.00 |
| Jordan | 2 | 1 | 1 | 0 | 2 | 1 | +1 | 50.00 |
| Kazakhstan | 1 | 1 | 0 | 0 | 2 | 1 | +1 | 100.00 |
| Kuwait | 2 | 1 | 1 | 0 | 6 | 4 | +2 | 50.00 |
| Latvia | 2 | 2 | 0 | 0 | 3 | 0 | +3 | 100.00 |
| Lebanon | 1 | 0 | 0 | 1 | 0 | 1 | −1 | 0.00 |
| Lithuania | 3 | 2 | 0 | 1 | 4 | 3 | +1 | 66.67 |
| Macedonia | 2 | 0 | 1 | 1 | 1 | 4 | −3 | 0.00 |
| Malta | 3 | 3 | 0 | 0 | 7 | 2 | +5 | 100.00 |
| Montenegro | 2 | 0 | 2 | 0 | 3 | 3 | 0 | 0.00 |
| Netherlands | 2 | 0 | 0 | 2 | 0 | 8 | −8 | 0.00 |
| Northern Ireland | 1 | 0 | 1 | 0 | 0 | 0 | 0 | 0.00 |
| Norway | 3 | 0 | 0 | 3 | 2 | 9 | −7 | 0.00 |
| Poland | 3 | 0 | 2 | 1 | 4 | 5 | −1 | 0.00 |
| Portugal | 2 | 0 | 0 | 2 | 1 | 9 | −8 | 0.00 |
| Romania | 6 | 1 | 1 | 4 | 7 | 14 | −7 | 16.67 |
| Russia | 3 | 0 | 1 | 2 | 1 | 6 | −5 | 0.00 |
| San Marino | 4 | 4 | 0 | 0 | 9 | 0 | +9 | 100.00 |
| Serbia | 1 | 0 | 0 | 1 | 0 | 2 | −2 | 0.00 |
| Slovakia | 4 | 1 | 0 | 3 | 5 | 14 | −9 | 25.00 |
| Slovenia | 6 | 1 | 2 | 3 | 5 | 11 | −6 | 16.67 |
| Spain | 4 | 1 | 0 | 3 | 4 | 18 | −14 | 25.00 |
| Sweden | 1 | 0 | 1 | 0 | 3 | 3 | 0 | 0.00 |
| Switzerland | 4 | 0 | 1 | 3 | 3 | 9 | −6 | 0.00 |
| Ukraine | 2 | 1 | 1 | 0 | 5 | 4 | +1 | 50.00 |
| Soviet Union | 2 | 0 | 0 | 2 | 0 | 7 | −7 | 0.00 |
| Wales | 5 | 2 | 0 | 3 | 5 | 7 | −2 | 40.00 |
| Total | 169 | 50 | 33 | 86 | 207 | 326 | −119 | 29.59 |

Source: Results
