= UEFA Euro 2000 qualifying Group 6 =

Football tournament qualification stage

Standings and results for Group 6 of the UEFA Euro 2000 qualifying tournament.

== Standings ==
Pos	Team	Pld	W	D	L	GF	GA	GD	Pts	Qualification	(Spain)	(Israel)	(Austria)	(Cyprus)	(San Marino)
1	Spain	8	7	0	1	42	5	+37	21	Qualify for final tournament	—	3–0	9–0	8–0	9–0
2	Israel	8	4	1	3	25	9	+16	13 (Note: Head-to-head points: Israel 4, Austria 1.)	Advance to play-offs	1–2	—	5–0	3–0	8–0
3	Austria	8	4	1	3	19	20	−1	13		1–3	1–1	—	3–1	7–0
4	Cyprus	8	4	0	4	12	21	−9	12		3–2	3–2	0–3	—	4–0
5	San Marino	8	0	0	8	1	44	−43	0		0–6	0–5	1–4	0–1	—

Source: UEFA
Rules for classification: Qualification tiebreakers

== Matches ==
5 September 1998
20:30 UTC+2

Austria	1–1	Israel
Reinmayr 7'	Report	Nimni 68' (pen.)

Ernst Happel Stadion, Vienna
Attendance: 20,000
Referee: Anders Frisk (Sweden)
5 September 1998
21:00 UTC+3

Cyprus	3–2	Spain
Engomitis 43'; Gogić 49'; Špoljarić 77'	Report	Raúl 73'; Morientes 90'

Antonis Papadopoulos Stadium, Larnaca
Attendance: 1,876
Referee: Sergei Khusainov (Russia)

10 October 1998
19:00 UTC+3

Cyprus	0–3	Austria
	Report	Cerny 55', 61'; Reinmayr 74'

Antonis Papadopoulos Stadium, Larnaca
Attendance: 5,679
Referee: Fernand Meese (Belgium)
10 October 1998
20:30 UTC+2

San Marino	0–5	Israel
	Report	Revivo 16'; Nimni 18'; Mizrahi 32'; M.Valentini 58' (o.g.); Ghrayib 82'

Stadio Olimpico, Serravalle
Attendance: 872
Referee: Asim Khudiev (Azerbaijan)

14 October 1998
19:30 UTC+2

Israel	1–2	Spain
Hazan 64'	Report	Hierro 65'; Etxeberria 78'

Ramat Gan Stadium, Ramat Gan
Attendance: 37,000
Referee: David Elleray (England)
14 October 1998
20:30 UTC+2

San Marino	1–4	Austria
Selva 81' (pen.)	Report	Vastić 58'; Mayrleb 64'; Hiden 69'; Glieder 76'

Stadio Olimpico, Serravalle
Attendance: 1,218
Referee: Valeriy Onufer (Ukraine)

18 November 1998
20:30 UTC+1

San Marino	0–1	Cyprus
	Report	Špoljarić 40'

Stadio Olimpico, Serravalle
Attendance: 510
Referee: John McDermott (Republic of Ireland)

10 February 1999
18:00 UTC+2

Cyprus	4–0	San Marino
Melanarkitis 18'; Konstantinou 32', 45'; Christodoulou 90'	Report

Tsirion Stadium, Limassol
Attendance: 4,000
Referee: Roland Beck (Liechtenstein)

27 March 1999
21:45 UTC+1

Spain	9–0	Austria
Raúl 6', 17', 47', 75'; Urzaiz 30', 44'; Hierro 35' (pen.); Wetl 76' (o.g.); Fran 84'	Report

Mestalla Stadium, Valencia
Attendance: 35,500
Referee: Gilles Veissière (France)
28 March 1999
18:00 UTC+2

Israel	3–0	Cyprus
Banin 11'; Mizrahi 48', 53'	Report

Ramat Gan Stadium, Ramat Gan
Attendance: 35,000
Referee: Marcel Lică (Romania)

31 March 1999
21:30 UTC+2

San Marino	0–6	Spain
	Report	Fran 20'; Raúl 45', 59', 66'; Urzaiz 49'; Etxeberria 72'

Stadio Olimpico, Serravalle
Attendance: 2,020
Referee: Goran Marić (Croatia)

28 April 1999
20:30 UTC+2

Austria	7–0	San Marino
Mayrleb 24', 53'; Vastić 42', 44', 84'; Amerhauser 71'; Herzog 82' (pen.)	Report

Arnold Schwarzenegger Stadion, Graz
Attendance: 15,400
Referee: Kyros Vassaras (Greece)

5 June 1999
21:45 UTC+2

Spain	9–0	San Marino
Hierro 8' (pen.); Luis Enrique 22', 68', 70'; Etxeberria 25', 45'; Raúl 56'; Gennari 87' (o.g.); Mendieta 89'	Report

Estadio El Madrigal, Villarreal
Attendance: 16,150
Referee: Gerard Perry (Republic of Ireland)
6 June 1999
18:30 UTC+3

Israel	5–0	Austria
Berkovic 26', 47'; Revivo 46'; Mizrahi 53'; Ghrayib 75'	Report

Ramat Gan Stadium, Ramat Gan
Attendance: 42,000
Referee: Ľuboš Micheľ (Slovakia)

4 September 1999
17:00 UTC+2

Austria	1–3	Spain
Hierro 49' (o.g.)	Report	Raúl 22'; Hierro 56'; Luis Enrique 88'

Ernst Happel Stadion, Vienna
Attendance: 27,000
Referee: Michel Piraux (Belgium)
5 September 1999
20:00 UTC+3

Cyprus	3–2	Israel
Engomitis 27'; Špoljarić 53', 86' (pen.)	Report	Badir 31'; Benayoun 82'

Tsirion Stadium, Limassol
Attendance: 12,000
Referee: Graham Barber (England)

8 September 1999
18:00 UTC+2

Israel	8–0	San Marino
Benayoun 25', 46', 70'; Mizrahi 38'; Revivo 40', 68'; Sivilia 84'; Abukasis 89'	Report

Ramat Gan Stadium, Ramat Gan
Attendance: 25,078
Referee: Ilhami Kaplan (Turkey)
8 September 1999
21:45 UTC+2

Spain	8–0	Cyprus
Urzaiz 20', 25', 38'; Guerrero 33', 42', 56'; Martín 82'; Hierro 88'	Report

Estadio Nuevo Vivero, Badajoz
Attendance: 13,700
Referee: Alfredo Trentalange (Italy)

9 October 1999
19:30 UTC+2

Austria	3–1	Cyprus
Glieder 5'; Vastić 23'; Herzog 81'	Report	Costa 63'

Ernst Happel Stadion, Vienna
Attendance: 10,100
Referee: Livio Bazzoli (Italy)
10 October 1999
19:30 UTC+2

Spain	3–0	Israel
Morientes 30'; Martín 37'; Raúl 51'	Report

Estadio Carlos Belmonte, Albacete
Attendance: 16,100
Referee: Hellmut Krug (Germany)

== Goalscorers ==
There were 99 goals scored in 20 matches, for an average of 4.95 goals per match.

11 goals

- (Spain) Raúl

6 goals

- (Spain) Ismael Urzaiz

5 goals

- (Austria) Ivica Vastić
- (Israel) Alon Mizrahi
- (Spain) Fernando Hierro

4 goals

- (Cyprus) Milenko Špoljarić
- (Israel) Yossi Benayoun
- (Israel) Haim Revivo
- (Spain) Luis Enrique
- (Spain) Joseba Etxeberria

3 goals

- (Austria) Christian Mayrleb
- (Spain) Julen Guerrero

2 goals

- (Austria) Harald Cerny
- (Austria) Eduard Glieder
- (Austria) Andi Herzog
- (Austria) Hannes Reinmayr
- (Cyprus) Panayiotis Engomitis
- (Cyprus) Michalis Konstantinou
- (Israel) Eyal Berkovic
- (Israel) Najwan Ghrayib
- (Israel) Avi Nimni
- (Spain) Fran
- (Spain) César Martín
- (Spain) Fernando Morientes

1 goal

- (Austria) Martin Amerhauser
- (Austria) Martin Hiden
- (Cyprus) Marios Christodoulou
- (Cyprus) Costas Costa
- (Cyprus) Siniša Gogić
- (Cyprus) Vassos Melanarkitis
- (Israel) Yossi Abukasis
- (Israel) Walid Badir
- (Israel) Tal Banin
- (Israel) Alon Hazan
- (Israel) Nir Sivilia
- (San Marino) Andy Selva
- (Spain) Gaizka Mendieta

1 own goal

- (Austria) Arnold Wetl (against Spain)
- (San Marino) Mirco Gennari (against Spain)
- (San Marino) Mauro Valentini (against Israel)
- (Spain) Fernando Hierro (against Austria)
