= 1994 FIFA World Cup qualification – UEFA Group 4 =

Football tournament qualification stage

The qualification matches for Group 4 of the European zone (UEFA) of the 1994 FIFA World Cup qualification tournament took place between April 1992 and November 1993. The group teams competed on a home-and-away basis for 2 of the 12 spots in the final tournament allocated to the European zone, with the group's winner and runner-up claiming those spots. The group consisted of Belgium, Cyprus, Czechoslovakia, Faroe Islands, Romania, and Wales. On 1 January 1993, Czechoslovakia split into the Czech Republic and Slovakia; the two nations completed the qualifiers as a single team under the name Representation of Czechs and Slovaks.

== Standings ==
Pos	Team	Pld	W	D	L	GF	GA	GD	Pts	Qualification	Romania national football team	Belgium national football team	Czechoslovakia national football team	Wales national football team	Cyprus national football team	Faroe Islands national football team
1	Romania	10	7	1	2	29	12	+17	15	Qualification to 1994 FIFA World Cup	—	2–1	1–1	5–1	2–1	7–0
2	Belgium	10	7	1	2	16	5	+11	15	Qualification to 1994 FIFA World Cup	1–0	—	0–0	2–0	1–0	3–0
3	RCS (Note: During the qualification, Czechoslovakia split into the independent states of the Czech Republic and Slovakia. The two states completed the qualifiers jointly under the name Representation of Czechs and Slovaks (RCS).)	10	4	5	1	21	9	+12	13		5–2	1–2	—	1–1	3–0	4–0
4	Wales	10	5	2	3	19	12	+7	12		1–2	2–0	2–2	—	2–0	6–0
5	Cyprus	10	2	1	7	8	18	−10	5		1–4	0–3	1–1	0–1	—	3–1
6	Faroe Islands	10	0	0	10	1	38	−37	0		0–4	0–3	0–3	0–3	0–2	—

=== Results ===
22 April 1992

Belgium	1–0	Cyprus
Wilmots 24'	Report

Constant Vanden Stock Stadium, Brussels
Attendance: 15,314
Referee: Manuel Díaz Vega (Spain)

6 May 1992

Romania	7–0	Faroe Islands
Balint 4', 40', 78'; Hagi 14'; Lăcătuș 28' (pen.); Lupescu 44'; Pană 55'	Report

Stadionul Steaua, Bucharest
Attendance: 10,000
Referee: Vassilios Nikakis (Greece)

20 May 1992

Romania	5–1	Wales
Hagi 5', 35'; Lupescu 7', 24'; Balint 31'	Report	Rush 50'

Stadionul Steaua, Bucharest
Attendance: 23,000
Referee: Fabio Baldas (Italy)

3 June 1992

Faroe Islands	0–3	Belgium
	Report	Albert 30'; Wilmots 65', 71'

Svangaskarð, Toftir
Attendance: 5,156
Referee: Leslie Mottram (Scotland)

16 June 1992

Faroe Islands	0–2	Cyprus
	Report	Sotiriou 30'; Papavasiliou 58'

Svangaskarð, Toftir
Attendance: 4,129
Referee: Leslie Irvine (Northern Ireland)

2 September 1992

Czechoslovakia	1–2	Belgium
Kadlec 77'	Report	Chovanec 45' (o.g.); Czerniatynski 83'

Stadion Evžena Rošického, Prague
Attendance: 10,500
Referee: Kurt Röthlisberger (Switzerland)
9 September 1992

Wales	6–0	Faroe Islands
Rush 5', 64', 89'; Saunders 28'; Bowen 37'; Blackmore 71'	Report

Cardiff Arms Park, Cardiff
Attendance: 7,000
Referee: Jorge Coroado (Portugal)

23 September 1992

Czechoslovakia	4–0	Faroe Islands
Nemeček 23'; Kuka 84', 86'; Dubovsky 90' (pen.)	Report

Všešportový areál, Košice
Attendance: 16,278
Referee: Ahmet Çakar (Turkey)

14 October 1992

Belgium	1–0	Romania
Smidts 27'	Report

Constant Vanden Stock Stadium, Brussels
Attendance: 21,000
Referee: Pierluigi Pairetto (Italy)
14 October 1992

Cyprus	0–1	Wales
	Report	Hughes 51'

Makario Stadium, Nicosia
Attendance: 12,000
Referee: László Vágner (Hungary)

14 November 1992

Romania	1–1	Czechoslovakia
Dumitrescu 49'	Report	Nemeček 82' (pen.)

Stadionul Steaua, Bucharest
Attendance: 28,000
Referee: Joe Worrall (England)
18 November 1992

Belgium	2–0	Wales
Staelens 53'; Degryse 58'	Report

Constant Vanden Stock Stadium, Brussels
Attendance: 21,000
Referee: Jan Damgaard (Denmark)

29 November 1992

Cyprus	1–4	Romania
Pittas 39' (pen.)	Report	Popescu 4'; Răducioiu 36'; Hagi 73'; Hanganu 86'

Antonis Papadopoulos Stadium, Larnaca
Attendance: 3,000
Referee: Neji Jouini (Tunisia)

13 February 1993

Cyprus	0–3	Belgium
	Report	Scifo 2', 5'; Albert 87'

Makario Stadium, Nicosia
Attendance: 3,000
Referee: Piero Ceccarini (Italy)

24 March 1993

Cyprus	1–1	Representation of Czechs and Slovaks
Sotiriou 47'	Report	Moravčik 33'

Tsirion Stadium, Limassol
Attendance: 2,000
Referee: José Mendes Pratás (Portugal)
31 March 1993

Wales	2–0	Belgium
Giggs 18'; Rush 39'	Report

Cardiff Arms Park, Cardiff
Attendance: 27,002
Referee: Aron Schmidhuber (Germany)

14 April 1993

Romania	2–1	Cyprus
Dumitrescu 33', 55'	Report	Sotiriou 23'

Stadionul Steaua, Bucharest
Attendance: 17,000
Referee: Alfred Wieser (Austria)

25 April 1993

Cyprus	3–1	Faroe Islands
Xiourouppas 7'; Sotiriou 43'; Ioannou 75'	Report	Arge 82'

Tsirion Stadium, Limassol
Attendance: 4,000
Referee: Haim Lipkovich (Israel)
28 April 1993

Representation of Czechs and Slovaks	1–1	Wales
Látal 41'	Report	Hughes 31'

Bazaly, Ostrava
Attendance: 7,000
Referee: Joël Quiniou (France)

22 May 1993

Belgium	3–0	Faroe Islands
Wilmots 33', 76'; Scifo 50' (pen.)	Report

Constant Vanden Stock Stadium, Brussels
Attendance: 20,641
Referee: Brendan Shorte (Republic of Ireland)

2 June 1993

Representation of Czechs and Slovaks	5–2	Romania
Vrabec 13'; Látal 37'; Dubovský 58', 84', 90'	Report	Răducioiu 26', 55'

Všešportový areál, Košice
Attendance: 15,000
Referee: Kim Milton Nielsen (Denmark)
6 June 1993

Faroe Islands	0–3	Wales
	Report	Saunders 22'; Young 31'; Rush 69'

Svangaskarð, Toftir
Attendance: 4,209
Referee: Vadim Zhuk (Belarus)

16 June 1993

Faroe Islands	0–3	Representation of Czechs and Slovaks
	Report	Hašek 3'; Poštulka 38', 44'

Svangaskarð, Toftir
Attendance: 1,000
Referee: Stephen Lodge (England)

8 September 1993

Wales	2–2	Representation of Czechs and Slovaks
Giggs 21'; Rush 35'	Report	Kuka 16'; Dubovský 67'

Cardiff Arms Park, Cardiff
Attendance: 37,558
Referee: Juan Ansuátegui Roca (Spain)
8 September 1993

Faroe Islands	0–4	Romania
	Report	Răducioiu 23', 58', 60', 76'

Svangaskarð, Toftir
Attendance: 2,724
Referee: Vadym Shevchenko (Ukraine)

13 October 1993

Romania	2–1	Belgium
Răducioiu 67' (pen.); Dumitrescu 85'	Report	Scifo 88' (pen.)

Stadionul Steaua, Bucharest
Attendance: 28,000
Referee: Sándor Puhl (Hungary)
13 October 1993

Wales	2–0	Cyprus
Saunders 70'; Rush 86'	Report

Cardiff Arms Park, Cardiff
Attendance: 30,825
Referee: Philip Don (England)

27 October 1993

Representation of Czechs and Slovaks	3–0	Cyprus
Dubovský 11'; Hapal 23'; Skuhravý 77'	Report

Všešportový areál, Košice
Attendance: 16,602
Referee: Lube Spasov (Bulgaria)

17 November 1993

Wales	1–2	Romania
Saunders 61'	Report	Hagi 32'; Răducioiu 83'

Cardiff Arms Park, Cardiff
Attendance: 40,000
Referee: Kurt Röthlisberger (Switzerland)
17 November 1993

Belgium	0–0	Representation of Czechs and Slovaks
	Report

Constant Vanden Stock Stadium, Brussels
Attendance: 21,000
Referee: Hellmut Krug (Germany)

== Goalscorers ==
9 goals

- (Romania) Florin Răducioiu

8 goals

- (Wales) Ian Rush

6 goals

- (Czechoslovakia) Peter Dubovský

5 goals

- (Belgium) Marc Wilmots
- (Romania) Gheorghe Hagi

4 goals

- (Belgium) Enzo Scifo
- (Cyprus) Andreas Sotiriou
- (Romania) Ilie Dumitrescu
- (Romania) Gavril Balint
- (Wales) Dean Saunders

3 goals

- (Czechoslovakia) Pavel Kuka
- (Romania) Ioan Lupescu

2 goals

- (Belgium) Philippe Albert
- (Czechoslovakia) Radoslav Látal
- (Czechoslovakia) Václav Němeček
- (Czechoslovakia) Marek Poštulka
- (Wales) Ryan Giggs
- (Wales) Mark Hughes

1 goal

- (Belgium) Alexandre Czerniatynski
- (Belgium) Marc Degryse
- (Belgium) Rudi Smidts
- (Belgium) Lorenzo Staelens
- (Cyprus) Yiannos Ioannou
- (Cyprus) Nikos Papavasiliou
- (Cyprus) Pambos Pittas
- (Cyprus) Panayiotis Xiourouppas
- (Czechoslovakia) Pavel Hapal
- (Czechoslovakia) Ivan Hašek
- (Czechoslovakia) Miroslav Kadlec
- (Czechoslovakia) Ľubomír Moravčík
- (Czechoslovakia) Tomáš Skuhravý
- (Czechoslovakia) Petr Vrabec
- (Faroe Islands) Uni Arge
- (Romania) Ovidiu Hanganu
- (Romania) Marius Lăcătuș
- (Romania) Constantin Pană
- (Romania) Gheorghe Popescu
- (Wales) Clayton Blackmore
- (Wales) Mark Bowen
- (Wales) Eric Young

1 own goal

- (Czechoslovakia) Jozef Chovanec (against Belgium)
