= 1998 FIFA World Cup qualification – UEFA Group 5 =

Football tournament qualifying stage

Group 5 consisted of five of the 50 teams entered into the European zone: (Note: Only 49 of the entered teams actually competed in the qualification tournament: France qualified for the World Cup automatically as host.) Bulgaria, Cyprus, Israel, Luxembourg, and Russia. These five teams competed on a home-and-away basis for two of the 15 spots in the final tournament allocated to the European zone, with the group's winner and runner-up claiming those spots.

== Standings ==
Pos	Team	Pld	W	D	L	GF	GA	GD	Pts	Qualification	Bulgaria national football team	Russia national football team	Israel national football team	Cyprus national football team	Luxembourg national football team
1	Bulgaria	8	6	0	2	18	9	+9	18	Qualification to 1998 FIFA World Cup	—	1–0	1–0	4–1	4–0
2	Russia	8	5	2	1	19	5	+14	17	Advance to second round	4–2	—	2–0	4–0	3–0
3	Israel	8	4	1	3	9	7	+2	13		2–1	1–1	—	2–0	1–0
4	Cyprus	8	3	1	4	10	15	−5	10		1–3	1–1	2–0	—	2–0
5	Luxembourg	8	0	0	8	2	22	−20	0		1–2	0–4	0–3	1–3	—

== Matches ==
1 September 1996
18:00 UTC+3

Israel	2–1	Bulgaria
Harazi 34'; Banin 62' (pen.)	Report	Balakov 3' (pen.)

Ramat Gan Stadium, Ramat Gan
Attendance: 13,200
Referee: Alfredo Trentalange (Italy)
1 September 1996
19:00 UTC+3

Russia	4–0	Cyprus
Nikiforov 8', 50'; Kolyvanov 34'; Beschastnykh 81'	Report

Dinamo Stadium, Moscow
Attendance: 8,500
Referee: Karl-Erik Nilsson (Sweden)

8 October 1996
20:00 UTC+2

Luxembourg	1–2	Bulgaria
Langers 20'	Report	Balakov 14' (pen.); Kostadinov 37'

Stade Josy Barthel, Luxembourg City
Attendance: 3,775
Referee: Yevi Kollari (Albania)
9 October 1996
18:00 UTC+3

Israel	1–1	Russia
Brumer 65'	Report	Kolyvanov 82'

Ramat Gan Stadium, Ramat Gan
Attendance: 32,000
Referee: Marc Batta (France)

10 November 1996
17:00 UTC+1

Luxembourg	0–4	Russia
	Report	Tikhonov 34'; Kanchelskis 38'; Beschastnykh 50'; Karpin 77'

Stade Josy Barthel, Luxembourg City
Attendance: 5,660
Referee: Juha Hirviniemi (Finland)
10 November 1996
18:00 UTC+2

Cyprus	2–0	Israel
Gogić 9', 15' (pen.)	Report

Tsirion Stadium, Limassol
Attendance: 10,500
Referee: Gheorghe Constantin (Romania)

14 December 1996
16:00 UTC+2

Cyprus	1–3	Bulgaria
Pittas 29'	Report	Kostadinov 23'; Balakov 34'; Iliev 70'

Tsirion Stadium, Limassol
Attendance: 6,500
Referee: John Rowbotham (Scotland)
15 December 1996
18:00 UTC+2

Israel	1–0	Luxembourg
Ohana 39'	Report

Ramat Gan Stadium, Ramat Gan
Attendance: 24,400
Referee: John Ashman (Wales)

29 March 1997
18:30 UTC+2

Cyprus	1–1	Russia
Gogić 31'	Report	Simutenkov 32'

Dimotiko, Paralimni
Attendance: 3,199
Referee: Juan Ansuátegui Roca (Spain)
31 March 1997
17:00 UTC+2

Luxembourg	0–3	Israel
	Report	Zohar 11', 79'; Banin 56' (pen.)

Stade Josy Barthel, Luxembourg City
Attendance: 6,607
Referee: René Temmink (Netherlands)

2 April 1997
18:00 UTC+3

Bulgaria	4–1	Cyprus
Borimirov 2'; Kostadinov 35', 45'; Yordanov 66'	Report	Okkas 62'

Vasil Levski National Stadium, Sofia
Attendance: 33,000
Referee: Serge Muhmenthaler (Switzerland)

30 April 1997
19:00 UTC+3

Russia	3–0	Luxembourg
Kechinov 20'; Grishin 55'; Simutenkov 58'	Report

Dinamo Stadium, Moscow
Attendance: 9,200
Referee: John Rowbotham (Scotland)
30 April 1997
18:00 UTC+3

Israel	2–0	Cyprus
Ohana 3', 72'	Report

Ramat Gan Stadium, Ramat Gan
Attendance: 32,000
Referee: Vasyl Melnychuk (Ukraine)

8 June 1997
20:00 UTC+3

Bulgaria	4–0	Luxembourg
Stoichkov 43' (pen.); Kostadinov 47'; Balakov 50' (pen.); Lechkov 81'	Report

Neftochimik Stadium, Burgas
Attendance: 19,000
Referee: Lucílio Batista (Portugal)
8 June 1997
19:00 UTC+3

Russia	2–0	Israel
Radimov 8'; Kosolapov 38'	Report

Dinamo Stadium, Moscow
Attendance: 22,000
Referee: Gerd Grabher (Austria)

20 August 1997
20:00 UTC+3

Bulgaria	1–0	Israel
Penev 65'	Report

Vasil Levski National Stadium, Sofia
Attendance: 32,000
Referee: Sándor Piller (Hungary)

7 September 1997
17:00 UTC+2

Luxembourg	1–3	Cyprus
Amodio 14'	Report	Papavasiliou 6'; Ioannou 55', 79'

Stade Josy Barthel, Luxembourg City
Attendance: 3,022
Referee: Gylfi Thor Orrason (Iceland)
10 September 1997
19:30 UTC+3

Bulgaria	1–0	Russia
Ivanov 55'	Report

Vasil Levski National Stadium, Sofia
Attendance: 55,000
Referee: Václav Krondl (Czech Republic)

11 October 1997
19:00 UTC+3

Russia	4–2	Bulgaria
Alenichev 13', 57'; Kolyvanov 41'; Yuran 52'	Report	Gruev 68'; Kostadinov 78'

Luzhniki Stadium, Moscow
Attendance: 19,000
Referee: Pierluigi Pairetto (Italy)
11 October 1997
19:00 UTC+3

Cyprus	2–0	Luxembourg
Papavasiliou 79'; Spoljaric 85'	Report

Tsirion Stadium, Limassol
Attendance: 4,000
Referee: Bujar Pregja (Albania)

== Goalscorers ==
There were 58 goals scored in 20 matches, for an average of 2.9 goals per match.

6 goals

- (Bulgaria) Emil Kostadinov

4 goals

- (Bulgaria) Krasimir Balakov

3 goals

- (Cyprus) Siniša Gogić
- (Israel) Eli Ohana
- (Russia) Igor Kolyvanov

2 goals

- (Cyprus) Yiannos Iouannou
- (Cyprus) Nikodimos Papavasiliou
- (Israel) Tal Banin
- (Israel) Itzik Zohar
- (Russia) Dmitri Alenichev
- (Russia) Vladimir Beschastnykh
- (Russia) Yuriy Nikiforov
- (Russia) Igor Simutenkov

1 goal

- (Bulgaria) Daniel Borimirov
- (Bulgaria) Ilia Gruev
- (Bulgaria) Ilian Iliev
- (Bulgaria) Trifon Ivanov
- (Bulgaria) Yordan Lechkov
- (Bulgaria) Luboslav Penev
- (Bulgaria) Hristo Stoichkov
- (Bulgaria) Ivaylo Yordanov
- (Cyprus) Ioannis Okkas
- (Cyprus) Charalambos Pittas
- (Cyprus) Milenko Špoljarić
- (Israel) Gadi Brumer
- (Israel) Ronen Harazi
- (Luxembourg) Paolo Amodio
- (Luxembourg) Robby Langers
- (Russia) Sergey Grishin
- (Russia) Andrei Kanchelskis
- (Russia) Valeri Karpin
- (Russia) Valery Kechinov
- (Russia) Alexei Kosolapov
- (Russia) Vladislav Radimov
- (Russia) Andrey Tikhonov
- (Russia) Sergei Yuran
