= 2000 Cyprus International Tournament =

Tournament details
- Host country: Cyprus
- Dates: 2 – 6 February
- Teams: 8

Final positions
- Champions: Cyprus (2nd title)

Tournament statistics
- Matches played: 10
- Goals scored: 37 (3.7 per match)
- Top scorer(s): (Lithuania) Arturas Fomenko (3 goals)

The 2000 Cyprus International Tournament was a winter international football friendly tournament held in Cyprus, between 2 and 6 February 2000. Besides the host nation Cyprus, Lithuania, Romania, Latvia, Slovakia, Georgia, Armenia and Moldova participated in the tournament.

Contests were held among the losers of the quarterfinal matches to determine the fifth to eighth places.

== Matches ==
Quarter-finals
2 February – Limassol
Cyprus | 2
Lithuania | 1
2 February – Larnaka
Armenia (a.e.t.) | 2
Moldova | 1
2 February – Paphos
Romania | 2
Latvia | 0
2 February – Larnaka
Slovakia | 0
Georgia | 2

Semi-finals
4 February – Nicosia
Cyprus (a.e.t.) | 3
Armenia | 2
4 February – Nicosia
Romania (p) | 1 (4)
Georgia | 1 (2)

Final
6 February – Nicosia
Cyprus (a.e.t.) | 3
Romania | 2
Third place
6 February – Limassol
Georgia | 2
Armenia | 1

=== Consolation tournament ===
Semi-finals (Place 5-8)
4 February – Larnaka
Moldova | 2
Lithuania | 1
4 February – Paphos
Slovakia | 3
Latvia | 1

Fifth place
6 February – Larnaka
Moldova | 2
Slovakia | 0
Seventh place
6 February – Larnaka
Lithuania | 2
Latvia | 1

=== Quarter-finals ===
2 February 2000
14:30 (UTC+2:00)

| Cyprus | 2–1 | Lithuania |
|---|---|---|
| Konstantinou 60', 88' | Report | Fomenko 86' |

Tsirio Stadium, Limassol
Attendance: 3,000
Referee: Romāns Lajuks (Latvia)
2 February 2000

| Armenia | 2–1 | Moldova |
|---|---|---|
| Nazaryan 45'; Dokhoyan 90+5' | Report | Popovici 70' |

Ammochostos Stadium, Larnaka
Attendance: 250
Referee: Michael Papamichael (Cyprus)
2 February 2000
19:00 (UTC+2:00)

| Romania | 2–0 | Latvia |
|---|---|---|
| Roşu 18'; Nicolae 69' | Report |

Pafiako Stadium, Paphos
Attendance: 300
Referee: Michalis Karaaiskakis (Cyprus)
2 February 2000

| Slovakia | 0–2 | Georgia |
|---|---|---|
| | Report | Ketsbaia 83'; Kavelashvili 86' |

Antonis Papadopoulos Stadium, Larnaka
Attendance: 400
Referee: Kostas Theodotou (Cyprus)

=== Semi-finals ===
4 February 2000

| Cyprus | 3–2 (a.e.t.) | Armenia |
|---|---|---|
| Melanarkitis 36'; Špoljarić 43', 114' | Report | Petrosyan 50'; Karamyan 74' |

New GSZ Stadium, Nicosia
Attendance: 5,000
Referee: Andreas Georgiou (Cyprus)
4 February 2000

| Romania | 1–1 (a.e.t.) | Georgia |
|---|---|---|
| Hîldan 81' | Report; Report 2 | Ketsbaia 41' |
Penalties
| (penalty scored) Bătrânu; (penalty scored) Dumitru; (penalty scored) Petre; (penalty missed) Niculescu; (penalty scored) Mara | 4–2 | Nemsadze (penalty missed); Ketsbaia (penalty scored); Dzhanashia (penalty missed); Silagadze (penalty scored) |

New GSZ Stadium, Nicosia
Attendance: 200
Referee: Kostas Kapitanis (Cyprus)

=== Third place match ===
6 February 2000

| Georgia | 2–1 | Armenia |
|---|---|---|
| Janashia 7'; Menteshashvili 55' | Report | Khachatryan 44' |

Tsirion Stadium, Limassol
Attendance: 6,000
Referee: Kostas Konstantinou (Cyprus)

=== Final ===
6 February 2000

| Cyprus | 3 – 2 (a.e.t.) | Romania |
|---|---|---|
| Okkas 5'; Poyiatzis 69'; Agathokleous 99' | Report | Mara 16'; Stoica 55' |

New GSP Stadium, Nicosia
Attendance: 4,000
Referee: Yiannakis Kyprianides (Cyprus)

== Winner ==
2000 Cyprus International Tournament

Cyprus
Second title

== Consolation tournament ==
=== Semi-finals ===
4 February 2000

| Moldova | 2–1 | Lithuania |
|---|---|---|
| Rogaciov 13', 76' | Report | Fomenko 78' |

Ammochostos Stadium, Larnaka
Attendance: 150
Referee: Dinos Gudman (Cyprus)
4 February 2000
19:00 (UTC+2:00)

| Slovakia | 3–1 | Latvia |
|---|---|---|
| Kizel 30'; Mintál 48'; Babnic 51' | Report; Report | Stolcers 85' |

Pafiako Stadium, Paphos
Attendance: 100
Referee: Anastasios Papaioannou (Cyprus)

=== Seventh place match ===
6 February 2000

| Lithuania | 2–1 | Latvia |
|---|---|---|
| Trakys 54'; Fomenko 89' | Report | Pelcis 4' |

Antonis Papadopoulos Stadium, Larnaka
Attendance: 600
Referee: Panikos Kailis (Cyprus)

=== Fifth place match ===
6 February 2000

| Moldova | 2–0 | Slovakia |
|---|---|---|
| Testemitanu 77' (pen.); Popovici 81' | Report |

New GSZ Stadium, Nicosia
Attendance: 100
Referee: Louis Loizou (Cyprus)

== Statistics ==
=== Goalscorers ===
There were 37 goals scored in 10 matches, for an average of 3.7 goals per match.

3 goals

- (Lithuania) Arturas Fomenko

2 goals

- (Cyprus) Michalis Konstantinou
- (Moldova) Serghei Rogaciov
- (Moldova) Alexandru Popovici
- (Cyprus) Milenko Špoljarić
- (Georgia (country)) Temuri Ketsbaia

1 goal

- (Cyprus) Yiannakis Okkas
- (Cyprus) Christos Poyiatzis
- (Cyprus) Marios Agathokleous
- (Cyprus) Vassos Melanarkitis
- (Romania) Bogdan Mara
- (Romania) Pompiliu Stoica
- (Romania) Laurenţiu Roşu
- (Romania) Marius Nicolae
- (Romania) Cătălin Hîldan
- (Georgia (country)) Mikhail Kavelashvili
- (Georgia (country)) Zaza Janashia
- (Georgia (country)) Zurab Menteshashvili
- (Armenia) Rafael Nazaryan
- (Armenia) Karen Dokhoyan
- (Armenia) Artur Petrosyan
- (Armenia) Arman Karamyan
- (Armenia) Vardan Khachatryan
- (Moldova) Ivan Testemitanu
- (Slovakia) Karol Kizel
- (Slovakia) Marek Mintál
- (Slovakia) Peter Babnic
- (Latvia) Andrejs Stolcers
- (Latvia) Eriks Pelcis
- (Lithuania) Valdas Trakys

Source: EU-Football

== See also ==
- China Cup
- Malta International Football Tournament
