= Cyprus International Football Tournament =

- Founded: 1997
- Region: Cyprus (UEFA)
- Teams: 4
- Current champions: Ukraine
- Most championships: Romania (3 titles)

The Cyprus International Football Tournament was an annual winter association football friendly competition for national teams that takes place in Cyprus. It was traditionally held in February as a friendly tournament since at least 1997, and last played in 2011. The 2006 tournament was played in two parallel groups.

== History ==
Of various matches played in February 1995 and 1996 it is not clear whether they were part of a tournament or not (most likely they were just a collection of unrelated friendlies).

=== 1995 ===
Norway 7–0 Estonia

Jakobsen ( 4', 73'), Bohinen ( 13', 58'), Brattbakk ( 48', 89'), Halle ( 57')

Cyprus 0–2 Norway

Leonhardsen ( 21'), Flo ( 24')

Cyprus 3–1 Estonia

Gogić ( 16'), Engomitis ( 83'), Larkou ( 85')
Reim ( 76' (pen.))

=== 1996 ===
Estonia 0–0 Azerbaijan

Cyprus 1–0 Estonia

Konstantinou ( 21')

Estonia 2–2 Faroe Islands

Kristal ( 13'), Rajala ( 45+1')
Johannesen ( 30'), Jarnskor ( 45')

Azerbaijan 3–0 Faroe Islands

Lychkin ( 10'), Hüseynov ( 23' (pen.)), Qurbanov ( 30')

== Winners ==
Season	Winners	Score	Runners-up	Ref
1997	Poland		Cyprus	
1998	Cyprus	1–0	Slovenia	
1999	Greece	1–0	Belgium	
2000	Cyprus	3–2 (a.e.t.)	Romania	
2001	Romania	3–0	Lithuania	
2002	Czech Republic	4–3	Cyprus	
2003	Russia	4–2	Romania	
2004	Romania	3–0	Hungary	
2005	Finland	2–1	Cyprus	
2006	Greece	2–0	Kazakhstan	
2006	Romania	2–0	Slovenia	
2007	Bulgaria	3–0	Cyprus	
2008	Apparently not as tournament (see Cyprus Four Nations Football Tournament 2008)			
2009	Ukraine	1–0	Serbia	
2011	Ukraine	1–1 (5–4 pen.)	Sweden	
