= Rainer Rauffmann =

Cypriot footballer

Personal information
- Full name: Markos Rainer Rauffmann
- Date of birth: 26 February 1967 (age 59)
- Place of birth: Kleve, West Germany
- Height: 1.89 m (6 ft 2 in)
- Position: Forward

Youth career
- 1972–1983: Siemens Amberg
- 1983–1984: FC Amberg

Senior career*
Years	Team	Apps	(Gls)
1987–1991	FC Amberg		
1991–1992	Blau-Weiß Berlin	18	(6)
1992–1995	SV Meppen	105	(37)
1995–1996	Eintracht Frankfurt	26	(4)
1996–1997	Arminia Bielefeld	4	(0)
1996–1997	→ LASK (loan)	16	(3)
1997–2004	Omonia	153	(192)
Total		322	(242)

International career
2002–2003	Cyprus	5	(3)

Managerial career
- 2005: Olympiakos Nicosia
- * Club domestic league appearances and goals

Markos Rainer Rauffmann (born 26 February 1967) is a former professional footballer who played as a forward.

After having played mainly for modest clubs in his country of birth, Germany, he revived his career in Cyprus where he played with success for Omonia, eventually representing the Cyprus national team despite having already reached his 30s.

== Club career ==
=== Germany ===
Born in Kleve, North Rhine-Westphalia, Rauffmann moved at the age of 16 to FC Amberg, a local team playing in the Oberliga, but only managed to stay a season there before moving to the seventh level. After five years in the amateur leagues he returned to the club, now as a semi-professional.

In 1991, Rauffmann signed for SpVgg Blau-Weiß 1890 Berlin which at the time was playing in the second division. He spent most of his first professional spell as a right back, still managing to score six goals although the side eventually suffered relegation.

Rauffmann continued to play in that tier in the next three years, now for SV Meppen where he made the transition to forward. In 1995, he joined Eintracht Frankfurt in the Bundesliga, making his debut in the competition on 12 August in the season's opener against Karlsruher SC and netting in a 2–2 home draw; he was fairly used during the course of the campaign, but again dropped down a level.

In the ensuing summer, Rauffmann signed with Arminia Bielefeld, but only lasted a few months, finishing the season on loan to Austria's LASK Linz.

=== Cyprus ===
In the summer of 1997, at age 30, Rauffmann moved to AC Omonia in Nicosia, which had been unsuccessful in winning a Cypriot First Division title for four years. He made an immediate impact in his new team, scoring twice on his debut and 42 times in the league in his debut campaign (47 in total), a record in European domestic leagues in the year, but failed to win the European Golden Shoe because of the punctuation system of the trophy.

Rauffmann forged a strong attacking partnership with the team's captain, Costas Malekkos. A penalty kick miss in the 25th round against Anorthosis Famagusta FC, however, eventually cost the team the title, lost to precisely that opponent.

Rauffmann against posted great individual numbers the next season, but his 42 successful strikes – 35 in league – were not enough to win Omonia any title, the league again being lost to Anorthosis, now on goal difference; his first club accolade arrived in 2000 with the conquest of the domestic cup, 4–2 against APOEL FC.

In 2000–01 Rauffmann, now captain after Malekkos' departure, led Omonia to its first league title in eight years, in spite of a poor start, netting 30 goals as the national championship was conquered in the last matchday. In the following season the player, who had won four consecutive top scorer trophies, had his worst scoring record of his six-year spell at the Makario Stadium, scoring 16 times.

Rauffmann won his second championship with Omonia at the end of 2002–03, at the age of 36, scoring a total of 41 goals in 40 official matches and also reaching the Cyprus national team, playing five matches in one year. At the beginning of the following campaign, however, he injured his knee against Doxa Katokopias FC, and retired before the end of 2003 with a total of 286 goals in 378 competitive matches.

After the end of his playing career, Rauffmann had a brief spell as manager at Olympiakos Nicosia without much success. He returned to Omonia shortly after, working mainly with the club's scouting staff.

== Personal life ==
After having baptised himself a Greek Orthodox, Rauffmann married Cypriot Maria, and the couple later welcomed daughter Mikaella.

== Honours ==
Omonia

- Cypriot First Division: 2000–01, 2002–03
- Cypriot Cup: 1999–2000
- Cypriot Super Cup: 2001, 2003; runner-up 2000

Individual

- Cypriot First Division: top scorer 1997–98, 1998–99, 1999–2000, 2000–01

Records

- Second-highest scorer for Omonia in all competitions
- Top scorer for Omonia in UEFA competitions
