= Marek Poštulka =

Czech footballer

Personal information
- Date of birth: 21 June 1970 (age 56)
- Place of birth: Bohumín, Czechoslovakia
- Position: Forward

Senior career*
Years	Team	Apps	(Gls)
1992–2000	FC Baník Ostrava	108	(28)
1997–1998	→ FK Viktoria Žižkov	3	(1)
1998–1999	→ FC Karviná	5	(3)

International career
1993	Representation of Czechs and Slovaks (RCS)	2	(2)
1994–1996	Czech Republic	2	(1)
- * Club domestic league appearances and goals

Marek Poštulka (born 21 June 1970) is a Czech former football player. He played international football for Czechoslovakia and the Czech Republic. Poštulka scored two goals in two games for Representation of Czechs and Slovaks (RCS, a temporary title after the dissolution of Czechoslovakia) and one goal in two appearances for the Czech Republic. He played more than 100 games for Baník Ostrava.

Poštulka seriously injured his knee for the third time in March 1996 while playing for the Czech Republic against Turkey. The injury caused him to miss out on selection for UEFA Euro 1996. He underwent a total of ten operations on his knees but they eventually brought about his premature retirement from football.

After his football career, Poštulka became a physiotherapist in Petřvald (Karviná District).
