= Klimis Alexandrou =

Cypriot footballer (born 1974)

Personal information
- Date of birth: 1 September 1974 (age 52)
- Position: Defender

Senior career*
| Years | Team | Apps | (Gls) |
| 1992–1994 | Pezoporikos Larnaca | | |
| 1994–2002 | AEK Larnaca FC | | |
| 2002–2004 | APOEL FC | | |

International career
| 1996–1999 | Cyprus | 8 | (2) |
- * Club domestic league appearances and goals

Klimis Alexandrou (born 1 September 1974) is a retired Cypriot football defender.
