= Marios Charalambous =

Cypriot footballer (born 1969)

Personal information
- Full name: Marios Charalambous
- Date of birth: June 18, 1969 (age 57)
- Place of birth: Limassol, Cyprus
- Height: 1.84 m (6 ft 0 in)
- Position: Defender

Senior career*
| Years | Team | Apps | (Gls) |
| 1987–2000 | Apollon | 288 | (26) |
| 2000 | Kavala | 14 | (0) |
| 2000–2002 | Olympiakos Nicosia | 35 | (0) |
| 2002 | AEL Limassol | 0 | (0) |
| 2003–2004 | Enosis Neon Paralimni | 8 | |
| Total | | 337 | (26) |

International career^{‡}
| 1991–2002 | Cyprus | 70 | (2) |
- * Club domestic league appearances and goals as of 28 May 2008 ‡ National team caps and goals as of 28 May 2008

Marios Charalambous (Greek: Μάριος Χαραλάμπους; born June 18, 1969) is a Cypriot former international football defender.

He started his career in 1986 from Apollon Limassol and he played there for thirteen years. Also, he played in Olympiakos Nicosia for two years and he ended his career in Enosis Neon Paralimni. He also had a brief spell with Kavala F.C. during the 1999–00 Greek Alpha Ethniki season.

Charalambous made 70 appearances for the Cyprus national football team from 1991 to 2002.
