= Marius Niculai =

- Born: Marius Niculai; 20 April 1979 (age 47) Constanța, Romania
- Height: 6 ft 3 in (191 cm)
- Weight: 226 lb (103 kg)

Rugby union career
- Position: No. 8
Senior career
| Years | Team | Apps | (Points) |
- RCJ Farul Constanța
- Stade lavelanétien
- SC Pamiers
International career
| Years | Team | Apps | (Points) |
| 2003 | Romania | 2 | (0) |

Marius Niculai (born 20 April 1979) in Constanța, is a former Romanian rugby union football player. He played as a No. 8.

== Club career ==
During his career, Niculai played for Farul Constanța in Romania, and for Stade lavelanétien and SC Pamiers all in France.

== International career ==
Niculai gathered 2 caps for Romania, both of them in 2003. He was a member of his national side for the 6th Rugby World Cup in 2003, where he played two matches in Pool A against Ireland and against the host country, the Wallabies.
