= Loukas Hadjiloukas =

Cypriot footballer and manager (born 1967)

Personal information
- Full name: Loukas Hadjiloukas (Λούκας Χατζηλούκας)
- Date of birth: June 6, 1967 (age 59)
- Place of birth: Paphos, Cyprus
- Position: Midfielder

Senior career*
Years	Team	Apps	(Gls)
1987–2000	APOEL	277	(48)

International career
1991–1997	Cyprus	26	(4)

Managerial career
- 2005: APOEL
- 2008–2010: Digenis Akritas Morphou
- 2010–2011: ASIL Lysi
- 2012–2014: Doxa Katokopias
- 2014–2015: Cyprus U21
- 2015–2016: Doxa Katokopias
- 2017–2019: Doxa Katokopias
- 2019: APOEL (caretaker)
- * Club domestic league appearances and goals

Loukas Hadjiloukas (Greek: Λούκας Χατζηλούκας; born on 6 June 1967) is a Cypriot football manager and former football player.

He had a great career while playing for APOEL, in which he won three Championships (1990, 1992, 1996), 5 Cups (1993, 1995, 1996, 1997, 1999) and 4 Super Cups (1992, 1993, 1996, 1997).

He was the chief scout for APOEL for several years. He served as the manager of Digenis Akritas Morphou and ASIL Lysi. He became Cypriot First Division manager during November 2012, taking over Doxa Katokopias.

== Honours ==
APOEL

- Cypriot First Division (3): 1989–90, 1991–92, 1995–96
- Cypriot Cup (5): 1992–93, 1994–95, 1995–96, 1996–97, 1998–99
- Cypriot Super Cup (4): 1992, 1993, 1996, 1997
