= Marios Agathokleous =

Cypriot footballer (born 1974)

Personal information
- Full name: Marios Agathokleous
- Date of birth: 8 September 1974 (age 52)
- Place of birth: Limassol, Cyprus
- Height: 1.78 m (5 ft 10 in)
- Position: Striker

Senior career*
Years	Team	Apps	(Gls)
1990–1997	AEL Limassol	97	(18)
1997–1998	Athinaikos	21	(11)
1998–2001	Aris Thessaloniki	72	(13)
2001–2003	APOEL	33	(8)
2003–2004	Anorthosis	23	(11)
2004–2005	AEP Paphos	8	(1)
2005–2006	Doxa Drama	33	(13)
2006–2008	Panthrakikos	38	(10)
2008–2009	Thermaikos		
2009–2011	Niki Polygyros		

International career
1994–2003	Cyprus	39	(10)
- * Club domestic league appearances and goals

Marios Agathokleous (Greek: Μάριος Αγαθοκλέους; born September 8, 1974 in Limassol, Cyprus) is a retired Cypriot football striker.

== Club career ==
Agathokleous last played for Thermaikos in the Greek Gamma Ethniki. His former teams are AEL Limassol, Athinaikos, Aris Thessaloniki, Anorthosis Famagusta, APOEL, AEP Paphos Doxa Drama, Panthrakikos and Thermaikos.

== International career ==
Agathokleous made 39 appearances for the Cyprus national football team from 1994 to 2003 and scored 10 goals.

== Career statistics ==
=== International ===
Appearances and goals by national team and year
National team	Year	Apps	Goals
Cyprus	1994	2	1
Cyprus	1995	7	4
Cyprus	1996	3	1
Cyprus	1997	1	0
Cyprus	1998	4	0
Cyprus	1999	3	0
Cyprus	2000	8	3
Cyprus	2001	6	0
Cyprus	2002	4	1
Cyprus	2003	1	0
Total		39	10

Scores and results list Cyprus' goal tally first, score column indicates score after each Agathokleous goal.

List of international goals scored by Marios Agathokleous
No.	Date	Venue	Opponent	Score	Result	Competition	Ref.
1	9 March 1994	Paralimni Stadium, Paralimni, Cyprus	Estonia	1–0	2–0	Friendly	
2	8 March 1995	Tsirio Stadium, Limassol, Cyprus	Sweden	1–0	3–3	Friendly	
3	29 March 1995	Tsirio Stadium, Limassol, Cyprus	Denmark	1–1	1–1	UEFA Euro 1996 qualifying	
4	11 October 1995	Tsirio Stadium, Limassol, Cyprus	Macedonia	1–1	1–1	UEFA Euro 1996 qualifying	
5	15 November 1995	Tsirio Stadium, Limassol, Cyprus	Belgium	1–0	1–1	UEFA Euro 1996 qualifying	
6	12 March 1996	Antonis Papadopoulos Stadium, Larnaca, Cyprus	Latvia	1–0	1–0	Friendly	
7	6 February 2000	GSP Stadium, Nicosia, Cyprus	Romania	3–2	3–2	Friendly	
8	2 September 2000	Estadi Comunal d'Andorra la Vella, Andorra la Vella, Andorra	Andorra	2–2	3–2	2002 FIFA World Cup qualification	
9	15 November 2000	Tsirio Stadium, Limassol, Cyprus	Andorra	3–0	5–0	2002 FIFA World Cup qualification	
