= Andreas Sotiriou =

Cypriot footballer (born 1968)

Personal information
- Full name: Andreas Sotiriou
- Date of birth: June 7, 1968 (age 58)
- Place of birth: Nicosia, Cyprus
- Position: Striker

Senior career*
Years	Team	Apps	(Gls)
1987–1998	APOEL	226	(105)
1998–2000	Anorthosis Famagusta	29	(12)
2000–2001	Digenis Morphou	5	(1)
2001	APOEL	4	(0)
Total		264	(118)

International career
1991–1999	Cyprus	39	(8)
- * Club domestic league appearances and goals

Andreas Sotiriou (Greek: Ανδρέας Σωτηρίου) (born June 7, 1968) is a former international Cypriot football striker.

He started his career in 1987 from APOEL and he spent his career mainly there, where he totally played for twelve years. He had also played for Anorthosis Famagusta and Digenis Morphou.

== Career statistics ==
=== International ===
Appearances and goals by national team and year
National team	Year	Apps	Goals
Cyprus	1991	5	0
Cyprus	1992	9	2
Cyprus	1993	8	4
Cyprus	1994	7	2
Cyprus	1995	8	0
Cyprus	1996	1	0
Cyprus	1997	0	0
Cyprus	1998	0	0
Cyprus	1999	1	0
Total		39	8

Scores and results list Cyprus' goal tally first, score column indicates score after each Sotiriou goal.

List of international goals scored by Andreas Sotiriou
No.	Date	Venue	Opponent	Score	Result	Competition	Ref.
1	16 June 1992	Svangaskarð, Toftir, Faroe Islands	Faroe Islands	1–0	2–0	1994 FIFA World Cup qualification	
2	2 September 1992	Kaftanzoglio Stadium, Thessaloniki, Greece	Greece	2–1	3–2	Friendly	
3	24 March 1993	Tsirio Stadium, Limassol, Cyprus	Czechoslovakia	1–1	1–1	1994 FIFA World Cup qualification	
4	14 April 1993	Stadionul Steaua, Bucharest, Romania	Romania	1–0	1–2	1994 FIFA World Cup qualification	
5	25 April 1993	Tsirio Stadium, Limassol, Cyprus	Faroe Islands	2–0	3–1	1994 FIFA World Cup qualification	
6	5 October 1993	Tsirio Stadium, Limassol, Cyprus	Israel	2–2	2–2	Friendly	
7	7 September 1994	Tsirio Stadium, Limassol, Cyprus	Spain	1–2	1–2	UEFA Euro 1996 qualifying	
8	16 November 1994	Tsirio Stadium, Limassol, Cyprus	Armenia	1–0	2–0	UEFA Euro 1996 qualifying	
