= Paolo Amodio =

Luxembourgish football manager (born 1973)

Personal information
- Date of birth: 28 May 1973 (age 53)
- Place of birth: Luxembourg
- Position: Striker

Youth career
- –1992: AS Differdange

Senior career*
| Years | Team | Apps | (Gls) |
| 1992–2001 | Jeunesse Esch | 208 | (77) |
| 2001–2002 | Progrès Niedercorn | 25 | (3) |
| 2002–2005 | Jeunesse Esch | 71 | (21) |
| 2005–2009 | Differdange 03 | ? | (23) |
| 2009–2011 | Belval Belvaux | ? | (?) |

International career
| 1996–1998 | Luxembourg | 10 | (1) |

Managerial career
- 2009–2011: Belval Belvaux (player-coach)
- 2011–2012: Differdange 03
- 2012–2014: Progrès Niederkorn
- 2014–2015: Titus Lamadelaine
- 2015–2016: Union Titus Pétange
- 2016–2018: Progrès Niederkorn
- 2019–2021: Differdange 03
- * Club domestic league appearances and goals

Paolo Amodio (born 28 May 1973) is a Luxembourgish football manager and former professional player. He played as a striker.

== Club career ==
Amodio emerged from the youth system of AS Differdange and went on to play for several clubs, including Jeunesse Esch, Progrès Niederkorn, and Differdange 03. During his time with Jeunesse, Amodio achieved six championship titles and won the national cup thrice. He wrapped up his active football career in 2011, playing for the lower-division club Belval Belvaux.

== International career ==
He was a member of the Luxembourg national football team from 1996 to 1998.

== Managerial career ==
After serving as a player-manager for Belval Belvaux from 2009 to 2011, Amodio took on the role of head coach at Differdange 03 for the 2011–12 season. He had previously played for the club until 2009 but left Differdange after just one season.

In October 2012, he assumed the coaching position at Progrès Niederkorn. In early May 2014, it was announced that he would leave the club at the end of the 2013–14 season, despite having a running contract. During the 2014–15 season, Amodio coached the Luxembourgish second division team Titus Lamadelaine. Following a merger with CS Petingen, he became the head coach of the newly-formed Union Titus Pétange. Amodio was dismissed on 30 September 2016, but he returned as the coach of Progrès Niederkorn just 18 days later.

In the 2017–18 season, he guided Progrès to second place in the league. He also managed the team in the historic 2–0 victory against Rangers. However, Amodio, along with assistant coach Emilio Lobo, was let go on 3 October 2018, due to a lack of on-field success. He later coached his former club Differdange 03 for an additional two years. Amodio announced his departure from Differdange at the end of the 2020–21 season but was prematurely dismissed on 22 March 2021, following a 2–1 defeat against Mondorf-les-Bains.

== Honours ==
Jeunesse Esch

- Luxembourg National Division: 1994–95, 1995–96, 1996–97, 1997–98, 1998–99, 2003–04
- Luxembourg Cup: 1996–97, 1998–99, 1999–2000
