= Walid Badir =

Israeli former footballer (born 1974)

Walid Badir وليد بدير
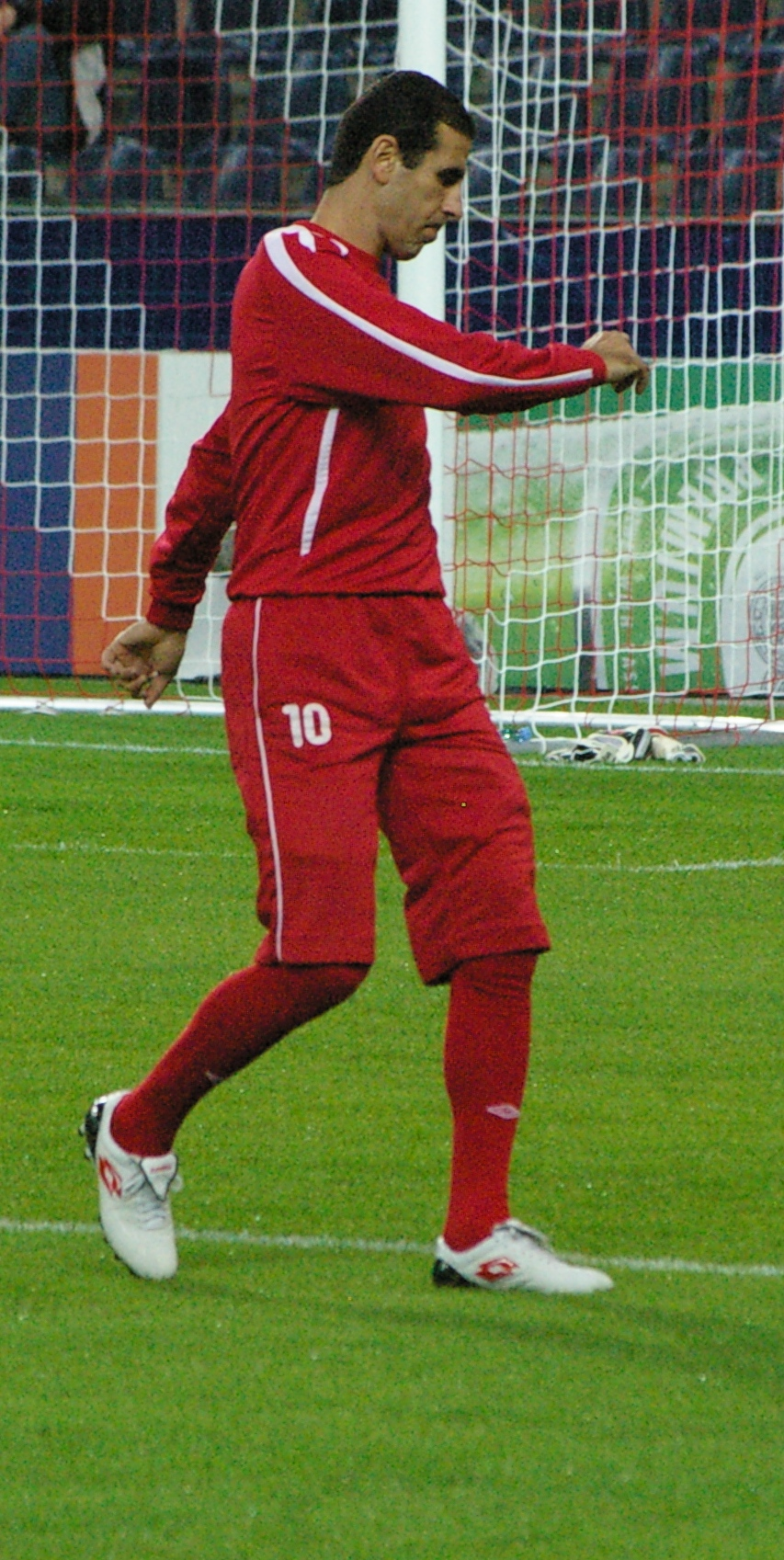
- Badir playing for Hapoel Tel Aviv in 2010

Personal information
- Date of birth: 12 March 1974 (age 52)
- Place of birth: Kafr Qasim, Israel
- Height: 1.83 m (6 ft 0 in)
- Position: Midfielder

Team information
- Current team: Hapoel Tel Aviv (assistant manager)

Youth career
- 1987–1989: Hapoel Kafr Qasim
- 1990–1992: Hapoel Petah Tikva

Senior career*
Years	Team	Apps	(Gls)
1992–1999	Hapoel Petah Tikva	153	(19)
1999–2000	Wimbledon	21	(1)
2000–2005	Maccabi Haifa	141	(28)
2005–2013	Hapoel Tel Aviv	237	(24)
Total		552	(72)

International career
1997–2007	Israel	74	(12)

Managerial career
- 2015–: Hapoel Tel Aviv (assistant manager)
- * Club domestic league appearances and goals

Walid Badir (Arabic: وليد بدير, Hebrew: ואליד באדיר; born 12 March 1974) is an Israeli former professional footballer who played as a midfielder.

He won four league titles in five seasons with Maccabi Haifa before joining Hapoel Tel Aviv in 2005. He served as their captain, and won a further league title before retiring in 2013. Badir scored 12 goals in 74 games for the Israel national team between 1997 and 2007.

== Early life ==
Badir was born in Kafr Qasim, Israel to an Arab-Muslim family.

== Club career ==
=== Early career ===
Badir was recognized early on as a valuable prospect, and played for the youth clubs Hapoel Kafr Qasim and Hapoel Petah Tikva, and later was given a spot on the second team's Premier League squad. Badir played for Petach Tikva for seven consecutive seasons (1992–1997) and scored 19 goals.

=== Wimbledon ===
During Badir's time at Wimbledon he scored one league goal against Manchester United at Old Trafford. However, other than this he did not make a major impact in his time with the club, making only 21 team appearances in total.

=== Maccabi Haifa ===
Badir returned to Israel to Maccabi Haifa in 2000–01 at the beginning of the Avram Grant era. Grant created one of the most gifted teams in the history of Israeli football. With Badir, Haifa won four championships, failing only once, in 2002–03 when Maccabi Tel Aviv won the title.

=== Hapoel Tel Aviv ===
In 2005, while Haifa began a major campaign to revamp the squad with South American players such ad Gustavo Boccoli and Roberto Colautti, Badir signed with Hapoel Tel Aviv. He became a major part of their 2005–06 season when they were runners-up to his former team and State Cup winners. He was awarded the captaincy of the team and held it until his retirement.

On 26 August 2013, in Bloomfield Stadium, the club and its fans made a thankful standing ovation in honour of Badir's last appearance with Hapoel Tel Aviv before formally retiring.

== Coaching career ==
17 November 2012, Badir was appointed as caretaker manager for Hapoel Tel Aviv.

== International career ==
Badir appeared in 74 games with the Israel national team, and scored 12 goals. His first appearance was on 5 August 1997 in a friendly match against Belarus (3–2).

One of his most notable games was his 83rd-minute goal in Israel's draw against France in a 2006 World Cup qualifying match.

== Honours ==
- Israeli Premier League: 2000–01, 2001–02, 2003–04, 2004–05, 2009–10
- Toto Cup: 2002–03
- Israel State Cup: 2006, 2007, 2010, 2011, 2012
