= Kostakis Konstantinou =

Cypriot footballer

Personal information
- Date of birth: 24 September 1968 (age 58)
- Place of birth: Limassol, Cyprus
- Height: 6 ft 0 in (1.83 m)
- Position: Defender

Senior career*
Years	Team	Apps	(Gls)
1989–1991	AEL Limassol	26	(1)
1991–1995	AC Omonia	87	(0)
1995–1996	Apollon Limassol	19	(0)
1996–1997	Barnet	1	(0)
1997–1998	APOEL F.C.	21	(1)

International career^{‡}
1989–1997	Cyprus	35	(1)
- * Club domestic league appearances and goals as of 21:09, 13 November 2012 (UTC) ‡ National team caps and goals as of 21:09, 13 November 2012 (UTC)

Kostakis Konstantinou (born 24 September 1968) is a retired Cypriot footballer who played as a defender, and was capped 35 times by the Cyprus national football team, scoring one goal.

== Career ==
Konstantinou played for four of the biggest clubs in Cyprus: AEL Limassol, AC Omonia, Apollon Limassol and APOEL F.C. In the 1997/98 season he played for English fourth-tier side Barnet, but only made one appearance, being substituted after 63 minutes against Cardiff City on 12 October 1996.

His son Alex Konstantinou is also a professional footballer and, like his father, has played football in England and for Apollon Limassol. He has been capped by Cyprus U-21s.
