= Costas Costa =

Cypriot footballer (born 1969)

Personal information
- Full name: Kostakis Costa
- Date of birth: January 4, 1969 (age 57)
- Place of birth: Glasgow, Scotland
- Height: 1.78 m (5 ft 10 in)
- Positions: Midfielder; defender

Senior career*
Years	Team	Apps	(Gls)
1989–1998	APOEL	152	(15)
1999	FC Utrecht	9	(0)
1999–2000	Apollon Limassol	6	(1)
2000–2002	Olympiakos Nicosia	36	(3)
Total		203	(19)

International career
1991–1999	Cyprus	34	(2)
- * Club domestic league appearances and goals

Costas Costa (Greek: Κώστας Κώστα) (born January 4, 1969) is a former international Cypriot football midfielder.

== Club career ==
He spent most of his playing career at APOEL, where he stayed for 9 years and won 3 Championships, 4 Cups and 4 Super Cups.1 double winning season 95-96

Later on, he played for FC Utrecht, Apollon Limassol and Olympiakos Nicosia.

He also had a trial with Newcastle United of England in 1993 and scored a goal from just over the halfway line against Annfield Plain of the Wearside Football League.

== International career ==
Costas Costas had also been an important member of the Cyprus national football team, having 34 appearances and scoring 2 goals.
