= Marios Christodoulou =

Cypriot footballer (born 1974)

Personal information
- Full name: Marios Christodoulou
- Date of birth: July 4, 1974 (age 52)
- Place of birth: Athens, Greece
- Height: 1.80 m (5 ft 11 in)
- Position: Midfielder

Senior career*
Years	Team	Apps	(Gls)
1990–1995	AEL Limassol	112	(17)
1995–1999	Iraklis	102	(10)
1999–2002	Aris	60	(7)
2002–2004	AEL Limassol	24	(2)
2004	Akratitos	0	(0)
2004–2007	Nea Salamina	65	(5)
2007	APOP Kinyras Peyia	8	(0)
2008	APEP Pitsilia	5	(0)
2008–2009	Ermis Aradippou	25	(15)
2009–2011	Nikos & Sokratis Erimis	0	(0)
2011–2012	AEZ Zakakiou		

International career
1996–2003	Cyprus	23	(3)

Managerial career
- 2011–2012: AEZ Zakakiou
- * Club domestic league appearances and goals

Marios Christodoulou (Greek: Μάριος Χριστοδούλου; born 4 July 1974) is a Cypriot football midfielder who is under contract for Nikos & Sokratis Erimis. In the past he played for APOP Kinyras Peyia, AEL FC, Iraklis, Aris Thessaloniki F.C., Akratitos, Nea Salamina, APEP Pitsilia and Ermis Aradippou.
