= Costas Malekkos =

Cypriot footballer (born 1971)

Personal information
- Full name: Constantinos Malekkos
- Date of birth: April 9, 1971 (age 55)
- Place of birth: Nicosia, Cyprus
- Height: 1.68 m (5 ft 6 in)
- Position: Attacking midfielder

Senior career*
| Years | Team | Apps | (Gls) |
| 1989–1997 | Omonia | 136 | (38) |
| 1997 | →Panathinaikos (Loan) | 12 | (1) |
| 1997–2000 | Omonia | 49 | (28) |
| 2000–2001 | AEL Limassol | 23 | (7) |
| 2001–2005 | APOEL | 60 | (27) |
| 2005 | Apollon Limassol | 8 | (3) |
| 2005–2007 | Olympiakos Nicosia | 8 | (1) |
| 2007–2009 | PAEEK | | |
| | Total | 296 | (105) |

International career^{‡}
| 1992–2002 | Cyprus | 44 | (4) |

Managerial career
- 2007–2009: PAEEK
- 2009–2010: Kedros Ayia Marina Skylloura
- 2012–2017: Cyprus U-15
- 2017: Ermis Aradippou
- 2018: Olympiakos Nicosia
- * Club domestic league appearances and goals as of 16 March 2008 ‡ National team caps and goals as of 16 March 2008

Costas Malekkos (Greek: Κώστας Μαλέκκος, born 9 April 1971) is a Cypriot former footballer who played as a midfielder for the Cyprus national team. He was the manager of Olympiakos Nicosia. He is considered one of the best Cypriot players of the 1990s.

== Club career ==
Malekkos started off from Omonia where he played for eight years. Then, in 1997 he moved to Panathinaikos but after a year he returned to Cyprus again to Omonia.

During his career, he played for other top Cypriot Clubs such as APOEL, AEL Limassol, Apollon Limassol, Olympiakos Nicosia and finished his career while playing for PAEEK.

== International career ==
Malekkos had been also an important member of the Cyprus national football team, having 44 appearances and scoring 4 goals.
