= Yiannos Ioannou =

Cypriot footballer (born 1966)

Personal information
- Full name: Yiannos Ioannou (Γιάννος Ιωάννου)
- Date of birth: January 25, 1966 (age 60)
- Place of birth: Nicosia, Cyprus
- Position: Striker

Senior career*
Years	Team	Apps	(Gls)
1981–2000	APOEL	371	(191)

International career
1991–1999	Cyprus	41	(6)
- * Club domestic league appearances and goals

Yiannos Ioannou (Greek: Γιάννος Ιωάννου) (born January 25, 1966) is a former Cypriot football player of APOEL FC and the Cyprus national team. He is widely considered one of the best strikers in the history of Cypriot football.

== Club career ==
He was one of the most successful strikers in Cyprus ever and because of that he was given the nickname "Mr Goal". Playing almost 20 years for APOEL, he won the Cypriot Championship 4 times, the Cypriot Cup 6 times and the Super Cup 6 times too. In addition, he was the top scorer in Cyprus in the seasons 1985-1986 and 1992–1993, scoring 22 goals in each season.

Ioannou has the most appearances and goals in the history of APOEL, with 504 appearances and 264 goals in all competitions.

== International career ==
Yiannos Ioannou had been also an important member of the Cyprus national football team, having 41 appearances and scoring 6 goals.

== Managerial career ==
He served for many years as assistant manager for APOEL.

== Honours ==
=== Club ===
APOEL

- Cypriot Championship: 1986, 1990, 1992, 1996
- Cypriot Cup: 1984, 1993, 1995, 1996, 1997, 1999
- Cypriot Super Cup: 1984, 1986, 1992, 1993, 1996, 1997

=== Individual ===
- Cypriot First Division Top Scorer: 1986
