= Siniša Gogić =

Cypriot footballer

Personal information
- Date of birth: 20 October 1963 (age 63)
- Place of birth: Niš, SR Serbia, Yugoslavia
- Height: 1.83 m (6 ft 0 in)
- Position: Striker

Senior career*
Years	Team	Apps	(Gls)
1982–1987	Radnički Niš	40	(4)
1987–1989	Rad	51	(5)
1989–1993	APOEL	95	(61)
1993–1997	Anorthosis Famagusta	78	(60)
1997–2000	Olympiacos	82	(27)
2000–2002	APOEL	51	(24)
2002	Olympiakos Nicosia	6	(2)
Total		404	(183)

International career
1994–1999	Cyprus	37	(8)

Managerial career
- 2007: Apollon Limassol
- 2008: Ethnikos Asteras
- 2008−2009: Red Star Belgrade (assistant)
- 2009: Red Star Belgrade (interim)
- 2009–2010: Panetolikos
- 2010–2011: Shenzhen Ruby
- 2011–2012: Olympiacos (youth coach)
- 2012–2013: Ergotelis
- 2013: Iraklis
- 2014: Kallithea
- 2014: Napredak Kruševac
- 2015: Acharnaikos
- 2016: Shenzhen Renren
- 2018–2019: Nafpaktiakos
- 2022: Maccabi Tel Aviv (assistant)
- 2023–2024: Krasnodar (assistant)
- * Club domestic league appearances and goals

Siniša Gogić (Serbian Cyrillic: Синиша Гогић, pronounced [sǐniʃa ɡôɡitɕ]; Greek: Σίνισα Γκόγκιτς; born 20 October 1963) is a football manager and former professional player who played as a striker. Born in Yugoslavia, he represented Cyprus at international level.

At club level he played for Yugoslav clubs Radnički Niš and FK Rad, for the Greece football team Olympiacos (1997–2000), the Cypriot teams APOEL, Anorthosis Famagusta and Olympiakos Nicosia and Cyprus national football team. After finishing his playing career, he became a manager.

== Playing career ==
=== Club ===
Born in Niš, SR Serbia, SFR Yugoslavia, Gogić began his career there, and played for the Yugoslav First League clubs FK Radnički Niš and FK Rad. Gogic first went to Cyprus in 1989 and played for APOEL where he won the championship in his first season. The same year Gogic became top goalscorer of the Cypriot First Division with 19 goals. He stayed at APOEL for a few years where he won the championship again in 1991–92 and the Cypriot Cup in 1992–1993. In 1993, after an argument with the APOEL coach, he left APOEL for Anorthosis and became again top goal scorer, this time with 26 goals and the following season, he helped Anorthosis win the Championship (1994/95) for the first time in 32 years and scoring 24 goals (2nd top scorer). He had a great season in 1996/97 (14 goals in 13 games) which attracted the interest of Olympiacos Piraeus. He joined Olympiacos at the age of 33, in 1997 from Cypriot side Anorthosis Famagusta and nobody could imagine his excellent attacking abilities.

He stayed at Olympiacos for 4 years, during which Olympiacos dominated the domestic league. Those four years Olympiacos became champions in Greece (1997–2000). 1998/99, was the greatest season for Olympiacos as the club won the Double and for first time reached the quarter finals of the UEFA Champions League. Gogic was considered one of the best Olympiacos players in the club's greatest achievement, in both Greek and European competitions. His nickname among the fans was "Pappous", which means "grandpa", because it was not until late in his career that he met with club success on a greater level.

In the first match against FC Porto, when Olympiacos was losing 2–0 away, he played for the last five minutes and he equalized by scoring Olympiacos' second goal. He scored several other goals in the Group stage and Olympiacos then faced Juventus in the quarter finals. After a 2–1 away defeat in Stadio delle Alpi, the result was giving enough chances for Olympiacos to qualify. Gogic played during the whole match in the second leg, in Olympic Stadium (Athens) and during the first 15 minutes he scored a goal for Olympiacos. The result, which would have given Olympiacos a place in the semi-finals for first time, remained unchanged until the 85th minute, when Antonio Conte equalized for Juventus and Olympiacos was eliminated.

One year later, Gogic left Olympiacos and returned to Cyprus, where he joined his favourite team APOEL again. In 2001–02 he helped his team once more to win the championship by scoring 16 goals in 26 appearances.

In 2002–2003, following financial differences with APOEL, he played for six months for Olympiakos Nicosia, where he ended his career.

=== International ===
On the national level, Gogić made his debut for Cyprus in a September European Championship qualification match against Spain and earned a total of 37 caps, scoring 8 goals. His final international was also a qualification match, for the 2000 Euros in October 1999, against Austria.

== Coaching career ==
At the age of 42 he became manager in Olympiacos' youth academies and after that at the age of 44 he was the manager of Cypriot team Apollon Limassol FC. On 14 September 2008 he was named as assistant coach at Red Star Belgrade, then on 9 May 2009 became the head coach at Red Star Belgrade, replacing Čedomir Janevski. On 12 June 2009, Gogić agreed with Panetolikos F.C. chairman Fotis Kostoulas to take over as manager of Panetolikos, replacing Vasilis Dalaperas. On 18 February 2010, he signed for Shenzhen Ruby. He managed the youth team of Olympiacos during the 2011–12 season.

In June 2012, Gogić was hired by newly relegated to the Football League side Ergotelis, who had set their sights at instant re-promotion to the Super League. He led the club for 9 1/2 months, boasting an impressive 12−5−3 record at the end of the competition first round. However, Ergotelis' performance dropped significantly during the second round, as the team struggled at home and away to secure more points for promotion, and dropped below 3rd place on the league table. After managing a sub-par 3−5−3 record during the second round of the competition, the club's board of directors decided to terminate Gogić's contract on 16 April 2013.

In May 2013, Gogić was hired by Iraklis.

In January 2023, he was hired as an assistant to Vladimir Ivić by the Russian club FC Krasnodar.

== Personal life ==
His son Alex Gogić is also a footballer and a Cyprus international, who currently plays for Scottish Premiership side St Mirren F.C.

== Career statistics ==
=== International ===
Appearances and goals by national team and year
National team	Year	Apps	Goals
Cyprus	1994	5	1
Cyprus	1995	10	2
Cyprus	1996	6	2
Cyprus	1997	5	1
Cyprus	1998	5	1
Cyprus	1999	6	1
Total		37	8

Scores and results list Cyprus' goal tally first, score column indicates score after each Gogić goal.

List of international goals scored by Siniša Gogić
No.	Date	Venue	Opponent	Score	Result	Competition	Ref.
1	29 November 1994	Teddy Stadium, Jerusalem, Israel	Israel	2–1	3–4	Friendly	
2	25 January 1995	Antonis Papadopoulos Stadium, Larnaca, Greece	Greece	1–0	2–3	Friendly	
3	15 February 1995	Tsirio Stadium, Limassol, Cyprus	Estonia	1–0	3–1	Friendly	
4	10 November 1996	Tsirio Stadium, Limassol, Cyprus	Israel	1–0	2–0	1998 FIFA World Cup qualification	
5	10 November 1996	Tsirio Stadium, Limassol, Cyprus	Israel	1–0	2–0	1998 FIFA World Cup qualification	
6	29 March 1997	Tasos Markou Stadium, Paralimni, Cyprus	Russia	1–0	1–1	1998 FIFA World Cup qualification	
7	5 September 1998	Antonis Papadopoulos Stadium, Larnaca, Greece	Spain	2–0	3–2	UEFA Euro 2000 qualifying	
8	18 August 1999	Tsirio Stadium, Limassol, Cyprus	Romania	2–1	2–2	Friendly	

== Honours ==
=== Club ===
APOEL

- Cypriot First Division: 1989-1990, 1991-1992, 2001–2002
- Cypriot Super Cup: 2002

Anorthosis

- Cypriot First Division: 1994-1995, 1996-1997
- Cypriot Super Cup: 1995
- Cypriot Cup runner-up: 1993-1994

Olympiacos

- Alpha Ethniki: 1997-1998, 1998-1999, 1999-2000
- Greek Super Cup: 1998-1999

=== Individual ===
Cypriot First Division top goalscorer: 1990, 1994
