= Vassos Melanarkitis =

Cypriot footballer (born 1972)

Personal information
- Full name: Vassos Melanarkitis
- Date of birth: August 11, 1972 (age 54)
- Place of birth: Famagusta, Cyprus
- Height: 1.75 m (5 ft 9 in)
- Position: Defender

Senior career*
Years	Team	Apps	(Gls)
1992–2001	Anorthosis Famagusta	181	(26)
2001–2003	Apollon Limassol	44	(2)
2003–2004	Anorthosis Famagusta	6	(0)
2004–2006	Apollon Limassol	8	(1)
Total		239	(29)

International career
1997–2001	Cyprus	33	(2)
- * Club domestic league appearances and goals

Vassos Melanarkitis (born August 11, 1972) is a Cypriot former international football defender.

He played for only two teams, Anorthosis Famagusta and Apollon Limassol.
