= Pambos Pittas =

Cypriot footballer (born 1966)

Personal information
- Full name: Charalambos Pittas
- Date of birth: July 26, 1966 (age 60)
- Place of birth: Prastio, Limassol, Cyprus
- Height: 1.78 m (5 ft 10 in)
- Position: Defender

Senior career*
Years	Team	Apps	(Gls)
1986–2002	Apollon Limassol	342	(49)
2002–2005	AEL Limassol	54	(2)
Total		396	(51)

International career^{‡}
1987–1999	Cyprus	82	(7)
- * Club domestic league appearances and goals as of 16 March 2008 ‡ National team caps and goals as of 16 March 2008

Charalambos "Pambos" Pittas (born July 26, 1966) is a former international Cypriot football defender and former captain of Cyprus national football team and Apollon Limassol.

He and Ioannis Okkas have the most appearances with Cyprus national football team (82 appearances). Pittas played for Apollon Limassol and AEL FC.
