= Antonis Papadopoulos Stadium =

Football stadium in Larnaca, Cyprus

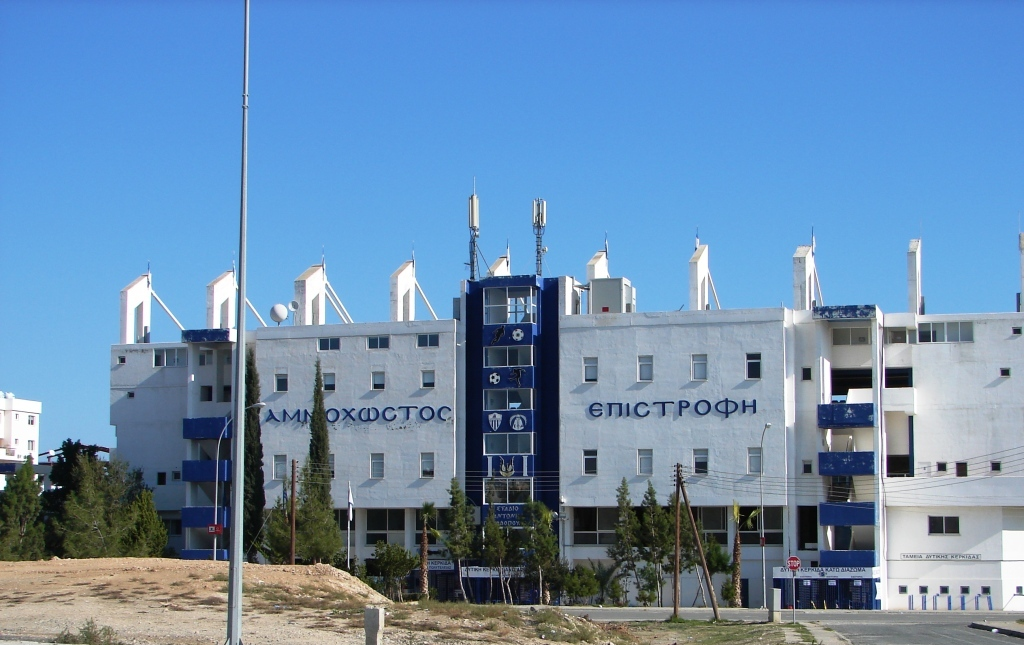
- The East and North stands of the stadium
- Interactive map of Antonis Papadopoulos Stadium
- Full name: Στάδιο Αντώνης Παπαδόπουλος (Antonis Papadopoulos Stadium)
- Location: Larnaca, Cyprus
- Coordinates: 34°56′15″N 33°37′15″E
- Owner: Anorthosis Famagusta
- Operator: Anorthosis Famagusta
- Capacity: 9,230
- Surface: Natural Grass
- Scoreboard: Yes

Construction
- Built: 1983–1986
- Opened: 1986
- Renovated: 1997, 2006, 2007, 2008
- Expanded: 1997

Tenants
- Anorthosis Famagusta (1986–); Nea Salamina (1987–1991, 2004–2005); Alki Larnaca (2010–2011); Ermis Aradippou (2016–2017); Aris Limassol (2022); UEFA U-17 Championship (2024)

The Antonis Papadopoulos Stadium (Greek: Στάδιο «Αντώνης Παπαδόπουλος») is a football stadium in Larnaca, Cyprus. It has a current seating capacity of 10230 and has been the temporary home stadium of Anorthosis Famagusta since its completion in 1986.

== History ==
The ground is the temporary home of Anorthosis Famagusta FC and bears the name of an Anorthosis benefactor. The initial capacity of the ground was about 6,000 but gradually increased over the years to 10,230. After a major recondition in 1997, capacity reduced to 9,230 (all seated). In 2005 the east stand was named the 'Quality Stand' after the club's main sponsor. The Quality Stand is a two-storey affair which holds the newly built VIP boxes (upper storey), press room, dressing rooms, bar, etc.

In 2006, the stadium went through another reconditioning, including the building of VIP boxes in the upper section of west stand, the launching of the automatic ticketing issue and entrance system, and the replacement of the metal front fence with clear plexiglass for security reasons and for maximum field view. Also some other facilities are offered in the west standm such as new restrooms, bar, and fans' shop. After new work on the stadium in 2008, the capacity has increased to 9,230.

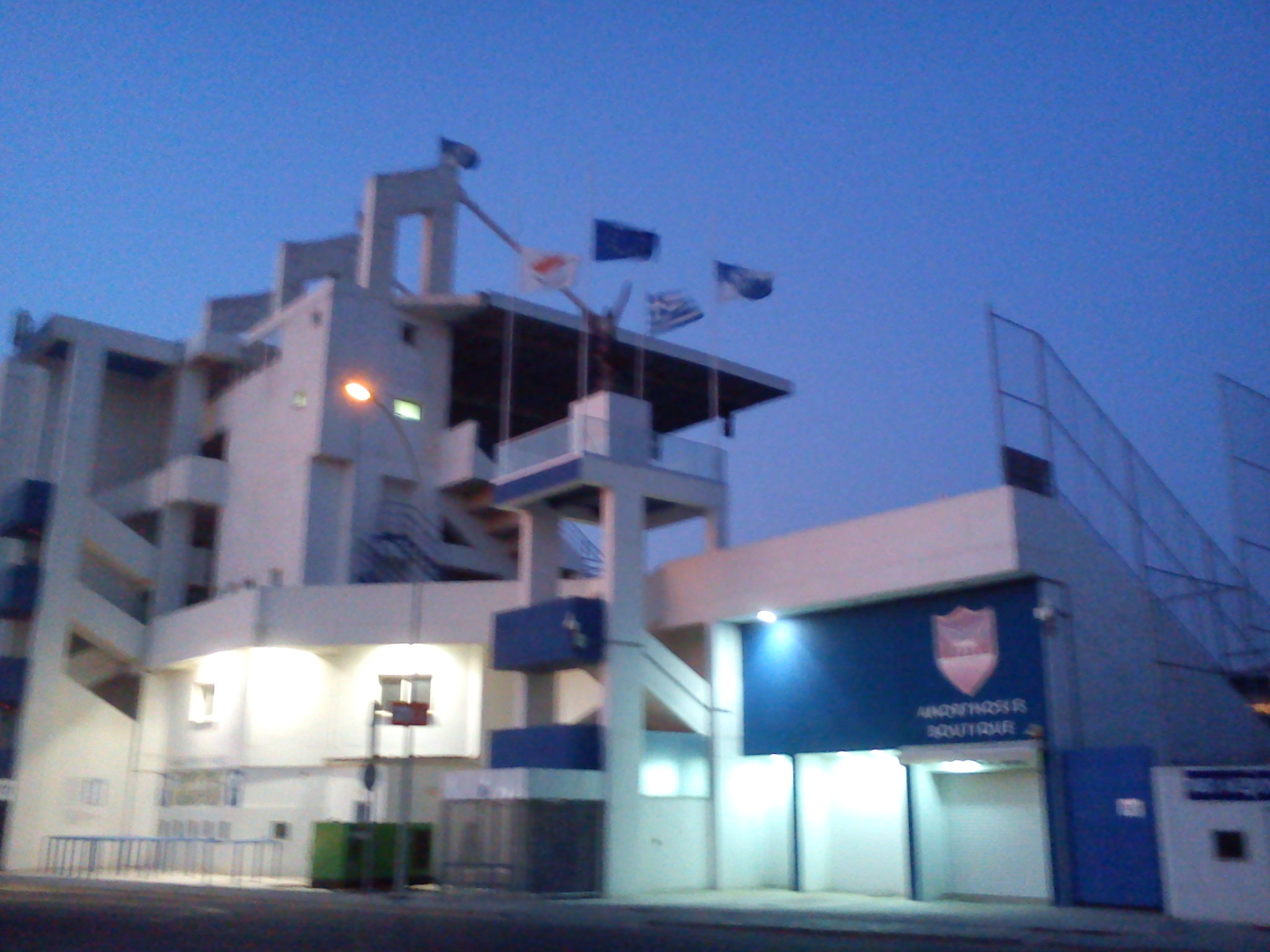
Antonis Papadopoulos Stadium's exterior

Anorthosis and the other Famagusta team, Nea Salamis FC, used to play in G.S.E. Stadium in Famagusta until 1974. After Anorthosis became a 'refugee team' following the Turkish invasion of Cyprus when Famagusta fell under Turkish occupation, the team played home matches at several stadiums, like Dasaki Stadium in Dasaki Achnas, old and new GSZ Stadium in Larnaca, and Tsirion Stadium in Limassol.

The ground is approved by UEFA for European games. It has hosted some matches of the Cyprus national football team. In that stadium, Cyprus national team achieved its greatest success against Spain by a score 3–2 in the Euro 2000 qualifiers on 5 September 1998. On 16 May 1992, the stadium hosted the 1992 UEFA European Under-16 Football Championship Third position final between Italy and Portugal, where Italy won 1–0.

On 23 November 2011, D. Ellinas group signed a contract with Anorthosis to build new offices for Antonis Papadopoulos Stadium. The old offices of the stadium will be a joint area outside the locker room, journalistic theory, clinics and other. The cost amounts to €400,000 but the company D. Ellinas group will build the offices for free in exchange, with advertisement from Anorthosis side.
