= Israel national football team results (1990–2019) =

This article provides details of international football games played by the Israel national football team from 1990 to 2019.

== 1990 ==
28 March Friendly	Greece	2–1	Israel	Athens, Greece
19:00 UTC+3	Manolas 64', 77'	Report	Sinai 76'	Stadium: Olympic Stadium; Attendance: 1,105; Referee: Vassilios Nikakis (Greece)

25 April Friendly	Israel	1–4	Romania	Haifa, Israel
18:00 UTC+3	Ahroni 73'	Report	Balbul 6' (o.g.); Hagi 13'; Sabău 45'; Balint 87'	Stadium: Kiryat Eliezer Stadium; Attendance: 3,000; Referee: Yaacov Scheiner (Israel)

16 May Friendly	Israel	3–2	Soviet Union	Ramat Gan, Israel
19:00 UTC+3	Malmilian 18'; Levin 31'; Banin 69'	Report	Lytovchenko 27'; Mykhaylychenko 42'	Stadium: Ramat Gan Stadium; Attendance: 50,000; Referee: Frans van den Wijngaert (Belgium)

22 May Friendly	Israel	1–2	Argentina	Ramat Gan, Israel
19:00 UTC+3	Banin 38'	Report	Maradona 35'; Caniggia 68'	Stadium: Ramat Gan Stadium; Attendance: 45,000; Referee: Vojtech Christov (Czechoslovakia)

9 October Friendly	Soviet Union	3–0	Israel	Moscow, Soviet Union
17:00 UTC+3	Yuran 3', 80'; Litovchenko 21'	Report		Stadium: Lenin Central Stadium; Attendance: 1,000; Referee: Karl-Josef Assenmacher (West Germany)

== 1992 ==
12 February Friendly	Israel	1–2	CIS	Jerusalem, Israel
15:30 UTC+2	Driks 36'	Report	Pyatnitsky 16'; Kiriakov 50'	Stadium: Teddy Stadium; Attendance: 2,000; Referee: Fritz Kaupe (Austria)

3 March Friendly	Israel	2–1	Cyprus	Bat Yam, Israel
16:00 UTC+2	Berkovic 27'; Cohen 39'	Report	Pittas 80' (pen.)	Stadium: Bat Yam Municipal Stadium; Attendance: 2,700; Referee: Lajos Hartmann (Hungary)

8 April Friendly	Israel	2–2	Iceland	Ramat Gan, Israel
17:00 UTC+3	Zohar 10'; Cohen 80'	Report	Grétarsson 15'; Grétarsson 67'	Stadium: Ramat Gan Stadium; Attendance: 1,500; Referee: Loizos Loizou (Cyprus)

5 August Friendly	Faroe Islands	1–1	Israel	Toftir, Faroe Islands
19:00 UTC+1	Reynheim 35'	Report	Banin 52'	Stadium: Svangaskarð; Attendance: 500; Referee: Kaj Østergaard (Denmark)

9 August Friendly	Iceland	0–2	Israel	Reykjavík, Iceland
18:00 UTC+0		Report	Berkovic 7'; Tikva 57'	Stadium: Laugardalsvöllur; Attendance: 1,277; Referee: Joe Timmons (Scotland)

9 September Friendly	Poland	1–1	Israel	Mielec, Poland
17:00 UTC+2	Szewczyk 24'	Report	Rosenthal 36'	Stadium: Stadion Stali Mielec; Attendance: 10,000; Referee: Karel Bohuněk (Czechoslovakia)

23 September Friendly	Hungary	0–0	Israel	Budapest, Hungary
17:00 UTC+2		Report		Stadium: Üllői úti Stadion; Attendance: 3,000; Referee: Roman Steindl (Austria)

28 October 1994 FIFA World Cup qualification	Austria	5–2	Israel	Vienna, Austria
	Herzog 41', 46'; Polster 49'; Stöger 56'; A. Ogris 87'	Report	Zohar 53', 77'	Stadium: Praterstadion; Attendance: 12,000; Referee: João Pinto Correia (Portugal)

11 November 1994 FIFA World Cup qualification	Israel	1–3	Sweden	Ramat Gan, Israel
18:30 UTC+2	Banin 42'	Report	Limpar 37'; Dahlin 58'; Ingesson 74'	Stadium: Ramat Gan Stadium; Attendance: 25,230; Referee: Serge Muhmenthaler (Switzerland)

2 December 1994 FIFA World Cup qualification	Israel	0–2	Bulgaria	Ramat Gan, Israel
		Report	Sirakov 56'; Penev 83'	Stadium: Ramat Gan Stadium; Attendance: 15,000; Referee: Vassilios Nikakis (Greece)

== 1993 ==
3 February Friendly	Israel	0–0	Poland	Ramat Gan, Israel
		Report		Stadium: Ramat Gan Stadium; Attendance: 2,000; Referee: Itzhak Ben Itzhak (Israel)

17 February 1994 FIFA World Cup qualification	Israel	0–4	France	Ramat Gan, Israel
		Report	Cantona 28'; Blanc 62', 84'; Roche 89'	Stadium: Ramat Gan Stadium; Attendance: 26,000; Referee: Ryszard Wójcik (Poland)

24 March Friendly	Israel	2–2	Russia	Haifa, Israel
	Mizrahi 64'; Harazi 70'	Report	Popov 50', 62'	Stadium: Kiryat Eliezer Stadium; Attendance: 3,000; Referee: Yaacov Scheiner (Israel)

27 April Friendly	Ukraine	1–1	Israel	Odesa, Ukraine
18:00 UTC+3	Konovalov 78'	Report	Harazi 55'	Stadium: Chornomorets Stadium; Attendance: 8,200; Referee: Nikolay Levnikov (Russia)

12 May 1994 FIFA World Cup qualification	Bulgaria	2–2	Israel	Sofia, Bulgaria
	Stoichkov 35' (pen.); Sirakov 60'	Report	Harazi 52'; Rosenthal 53'	Stadium: Vasil Levski National Stadium; Attendance: 25,000; Referee: Ahmet Çakar (Turkey)

2 June 1994 FIFA World Cup qualification	Sweden	5–0	Israel	Solna, Sweden
19:00 UTC+2	Brolin 17', 41', 65'; Zetterberg 55'; Landberg 89'	Report		Stadium: Råsunda Stadium; Attendance: 22,042; Referee: Sergei Khusainov (Russia)

16 June 1994 FIFA World Cup qualification	Finland	0–0	Israel	Lahti, Finland
		Report		Stadium: Lahti Stadium; Attendance: 4,620; Referee: Volodymyr Pyanykh (Ukraine)

22 September Friendly	Romania	1–0	Israel	Bucharest, Romania
	Panduru 49'	Report		Stadium: Stadionul Steaua; Attendance: 4,000; Referee: Adrian Porumboiu (Romania)

5 October Friendly	Cyprus	2–2	Israel	Limassol, Cyprus
19:00 UTC+2	Pittas 24'; Sotiriou 71'	Report	Harazi 33', 66'	Stadium: Tsirio Stadium; Attendance: 400; Referee: Loizos Loizou (Cyprus)

13 October 1994 FIFA World Cup qualification	France	2–3	Israel	Paris, France
20:45 UTC+1	Sauzée 32'; Ginola 43'	Report	R. Harazi 21'; Berkovich 83'; Atar 90'	Stadium: Parc des Princes; Attendance: 32,700; Referee: Alan Snoddy (Northern Ireland)

27 October 1994 FIFA World Cup qualification	Israel	1–1	Austria	Ramat Gan, Israel
	Rosenthal 3'	Report	Reinmayr 15'	Stadium: Ramat Gan Stadium; Attendance: 23,500; Referee: László Vágner (Hungary)

10 November 1994 FIFA World Cup qualification	Israel	1–3	Finland	Ramat Gan, Israel
	Harazi 90'	Report	Hyryläinen 54', 85'; Hjelm 73'	Stadium: Ramat Gan Stadium; Attendance: 10,000; Referee: Daniel Roduit (Switzerland)

== 1994 ==
23 February Friendly	Israel	2–0	Georgia	Ashdod, Israel
	Ohana 28', 77'	Report		Stadium: Yud-Alef Stadium; Attendance: 1,500; Referee: Haim Lipkovich (Israel)

15 March Friendly	Israel	1–0	Ukraine	Haifa, Israel
15:00 UTC+2	Tal Banin 40' (pen.)	Report		Stadium: Kiryat Eliezer Stadium; Attendance: 4,000; Referee: Daud Souhel (Israel)

20 April Friendly	Lithuania	1–1	Israel	Vilnius, Lithuania
	Baltušnikas 40'	Report	Harazi 7'	Stadium: Žalgiris Stadium; Attendance: 4,500; Referee: Vadim Zhuk (Belarus)

31 May Friendly	Israel	0–3	Argentina	Ramat Gan, Israel
		Report	Batistuta 27', 49'; Caniggia 53'	Stadium: Ramat Gan Stadium; Attendance: 35,000; Referee: Loizos Loizou (Cyprus)

17 August Friendly	Israel	0–4	Croatia	Ramat Gan, Israel
19:00 UTC+3		Report	Cvitanović 3', 34'; Jurčević 53'; Mumlek 89'	Stadium: Ramat Gan Stadium; Attendance: 5,000; Referee: Daud Souhel (Israel)

4 September UEFA Euro 1996 qualifying	Israel	2–1	Poland	Ramat Gan, Israel
17:00 UTC+2	Harazi 44', 59'	Report	Kosecki 80'	Stadium: Ramat Gan Stadium; Attendance: 3,500; Referee: Frans van den Wijngaert (Belgium)

12 October UEFA Euro 1996 qualifying	Israel	2–2	Slovakia	Ramat Gan, Israel
18:00 UTC+2	Harazi 23'; Banin 32' (pen.)	Report	Rusnák 5'; Moravčík 14'	Stadium: Ramat Gan Stadium; Attendance: 7,500; Referee: John Blankenstein (Netherlands)

16 November UEFA Euro 1996 qualifying	Azerbaijan	0–2	Israel	Trabzon, Turkey
19:00 UTC+2		Report	R. Harazi 30'; Rosenthal 51'	Stadium: Hüseyin Avni Aker Stadium; Attendance: 2,863; Referee: László Vágner (Hungary)

29 November Friendly	Israel	4–3	Cyprus	Jerusalem, Israel
17:00 UTC+2	Hazan 25', 37'; Harazi 39'; Rosenthal 76'	Report	Halfon 15' (o.g.); Gogić 33'; Hadjiloukas 55'	Stadium: Teddy Stadium; Attendance: 4,000; Referee: Daud Souhel (Israel)

14 December UEFA Euro 1996 qualifying	Israel	1–1	Romania	Ramat Gan, Israel
18:00 UTC+2	Rosenthal 84'	Report	Lăcătuş 69'	Stadium: Ramat Gan Stadium; Attendance: 38,000; Referee: Antonio Martín Navarrete (Spain)

== 1995 ==
14 February Friendly	Israel	4–2	Luxembourg	Ashdod, Israel
	Harazi 22' (pen.); Hazan 34'; Turgeman 57'; Birsens 89' (o.g.)	Report	Langers 71', 77'	Stadium: Yud-Alef Stadium; Attendance: 1,500; Referee: Vahap Beyaz (Turkey)

8 March Friendly	Turkey	2–1	Israel	Istanbul, Turkey
20:30 UTC+2	Kocaman 72'; Kaya 90'	Report	Harazi 42'	Stadium: Şükrü Saracoğlu Stadium; Attendance: 6,000; Referee: Walter Cinciripini (Italy)

29 March UEFA Euro 1996 qualifying	Israel	0–0	France	Ramat Gan, Israel
17:00 UTC+2		Report		Stadium: Ramat Gan Stadium; Attendance: 39,000; Referee: Jim McCluskey (Scotland)

25 April UEFA Euro 1996 qualifying	Poland	4–3	Israel	Zabrze, Poland
17:30 UTC+2	Nowak 1'; Juskowiak 50'; Kowalczyk 55'; Kosecki 62'	Report	Rosenthal 33'; Revivo 38'; Zohar 70'	Stadium: Górnik Zabrze Stadium; Attendance: 5,500; Referee: Anders Frisk (Sweden)

17 May Friendly	Israel	1–2	Brazil	Ramat Gan, Israel
	Brumer 83'	Report	Túlio 39'; Rivaldo 41'	Stadium: Ramat Gan Stadium; Attendance: 27,000; Referee: Sándor Puhl (Hungary)

7 June UEFA Euro 1996 qualifying	Romania	2–1	Israel	Bucharest, Romania
20:00 UTC+3	Lăcătuş 15'; Munteanu 65'	Report	Berkovic 50'	Stadium: Stadionul Steaua; Attendance: 18,575; Referee: Rune Pedersen (Norway)

16 August Friendly	Hungary	0–2	Israel	Siófok, Hungary
20:00 UTC+2		Report	Revivo 19'; Mizrahi 51'	Stadium: Révész Géza utcai Stadion; Attendance: 10,000; Referee: Adrian Porumboiu (Romania)

6 September UEFA Euro 1996 qualifying	Slovakia	1–0	Israel	Košice, Slovakia
18:00 UTC+2	Jančula 54'	Report		Stadium: Všešportový areál Attendance: 7,810; Referee: Marnix Sandra (Belgium)

20 September Friendly	Israel	3–1	Uruguay	Jerusalem, Israel
18:00 UTC+2	Ohana 34'; Atar 57'; Driks 80'	Report	Otero 65'	Stadium: Teddy Stadium; Attendance: 8,000; Referee: Amit Klein (Israel)

11 October UEFA Euro 1996 qualifying	Israel	2–0	Azerbaijan	Tel Aviv, Israel
18:00 UTC+2	R. Harazi 31', 90'	Report		Stadium: Bloomfield Stadium; Attendance: 7,000; Referee: Claude Détruche (Switzerland)

15 November UEFA Euro 1996 qualifying	France	2–0	Israel	Caen, France
20:45 UTC+1	Djorkaeff 69'; Lizarazu 89'	Report		Stadium: Stade Michel d'Ornano; Attendance: 20,822; Referee: Gerd Grabher (Austria)

== 1996 ==
24 January Friendly	Greece	2–1	Israel	Chalkida, Greece
	Glam 27' (o.g.); Tsiartas 44' (pen.)	Report	Harazi 89'	Stadium: Municipal Stadium of Chalkida; Attendance: 2,121; Referee: Vasilis Nikakis (Greece)

21 February Friendly	Israel	4–2	Lithuania	Haifa, Israel
	Atar 23'; Banin 30'; Zohar 75'; Turgeman 85'	Report	Maciulevičius 32'; Rimkus 89'	Stadium: Kiryat Eliezer Stadium; Attendance: 2,000; Referee: Dani Koren (Israel)

26 March Friendly	Croatia	2–0	Israel	Varaždin, Croatia
16:00 UTC+1	Štimac 74'; Vlaović 76'	Report		Stadium: Stadion Varteks; Attendance: 3,684; Referee: Vencel Tóth (Hungary)

30 April Friendly	Israel	4–5	South Korea	Tel Aviv, Israel
17:00 UTC+3	Revivo 75', 87'; Banin 81' (pen.); Zohar 90'	Report	Kim Do-Hoon 4'; Yoo Sang-Chul 37'; Shin Tae-Yong 41'; Hwang Sun-Hong 57' (pen.)	Stadium: Bloomfield Stadium; Attendance: 3,000; Referee: Ünsal Çimen (Turkey)

14 August Friendly	Romania	2–0	Israel	Bucharest, Romania
20:00 UTC+3	Ilie 18'; Craioveanu 82'	Report		Stadium: Stadionul Steaua; Attendance: 5,000; Referee: Attila Juhos (Hungary)

1 September 1998 FIFA World Cup qualification	Israel	2–1	Bulgaria	Ramat Gan, Israel
18:00 UTC+3	Harazi 34'; Banin 62'	Report	Balakov 3' (pen.)	Stadium: Ramat Gan Stadium; Attendance: 13,200; Referee: Alfredo Trentalange (Italy)

9 October 1998 FIFA World Cup qualification	Israel	1–1	Russia	Ramat Gan, Israel
18:00 UTC+3	Brumer 65'	Report	Kolyvanov 82'	Stadium: Ramat Gan Stadium; Attendance: 32,000; Referee: Marc Batta (France)

10 November 1998 FIFA World Cup qualification	Cyprus	2–0	Israel	Limassol, Cyprus
18:00 UTC+2	Gogić 9', 15' (pen.)	Report		Stadium: Tsirion Stadium; Attendance: 10,500; Referee: Gheorghe Constantin (Romania)

15 December 1998 FIFA World Cup qualification	Israel	1–0	Luxembourg	Ramat Gan, Israel
18:00 UTC+2	Ohana 39'	Report		Stadium: Ramat Gan Stadium; Attendance: 24,400; Referee: John Ashman (Wales)

== 1997 ==
22 January Friendly	Israel	1–1	Greece	Jerusalem, Israel
	Zohar 57'	Report	Kostis 9'	Stadium: Teddy Stadium; Attendance: 500; Referee: Abraham Klein (Israel)

26 February Friendly	Israel	0–1	Germany	Ramat Gan, Israel
18:45 UTC+2		Report	Wosz 85'	Stadium: Ramat Gan Stadium; Attendance: 22,000; Referee: Stefano Braschi (Italy)

12 March Friendly	Israel	0–1	Sweden	Ramat Gan, Israel
		Report	Andr. Andersson 69'	Stadium: Ramat Gan Stadium; Attendance: 12,000; Referee: Hartmut Strampe (Germany)

31 March 1998 FIFA World Cup qualification	Luxembourg	0–3	Israel	Luxembourg City, Luxembourg
17:00 UTC+2		Report	Zohar 11', 79'; Banin 86' (pen.)	Stadium: Stade Josy Barthel; Attendance: 6,066; Referee: René Temmink (Netherlands)

30 April 1998 FIFA World Cup qualification	Israel	2–0	Cyprus	Ramat Gan, Israel
18:00 UTC+3	Ohana 3', 72'	Report		Stadium: Ramat Gan Stadium; Attendance: 32,000; Referee: Vasyl Melnychuk (Ukraine)

8 June 1998 FIFA World Cup qualification	Russia	2–0	Israel	Moscow, Russia
19:00 UTC+3	Radimov 8'; Kosolapov 38'	Report		Stadium: Dinamo Stadium; Attendance: 22,000; Referee: Gerd Grabher (Austria)

17 June Friendly	United States	2–1	Israel	Jacksonville, United States
19:00 UTC-4	Lalas 28'; Kirovski 65'	Report	Glam 83'	Stadium: Alltel Stadium; Attendance: 8,436; Referee: Zimmermann Boulos (United States)

5 August Friendly	Belarus	2–3	Israel	Minsk, Belarus
19:00 UTC+3	Skrypchanka 73'; Ryndzyuk 90'	Report	Hazan 57'; Nimni 71'; Mizrahi 88'	Stadium: Dinamo Stadium; Attendance: 4,000; Referee: Serhiy Tatulyan (Ukraine)

20 August 1998 FIFA World Cup qualification	Bulgaria	1–0	Israel	Sofia, Bulgaria
20:00 UTC+3	Penev 65'	Report		Stadium: Vasil Levski National Stadium; Attendance: 32,000; Referee: Sándor Piller (Hungary)

== 1998 ==
18 February Friendly	Israel	4–0	Turkey	Ramat Gan, Israel
18:00 UTC+2	Talesnikov 12'; Harazi 23'; Mizrahi 51', 62'	Report		Stadium: Ramat Gan Stadium; Attendance: 10,000; Referee: Rémi Harrel (France)

25 February Friendly	Israel	2–0	Poland	Ramat Gan, Israel
18:00 UTC+2	Talesnikov 28'; Mizrahi 83'	Report		Stadium: Ramat Gan Stadium; Attendance: 12,000; Referee: Graziano Cesari (Italy)

18 March Friendly	Romania	0–1	Israel	Bucharest, Romania
18:00 UTC+2		Report	Mizrahi 13'	Stadium: Stadionul Steaua; Attendance: 5,000; Referee: Muhittin Boşat (Turkey)

15 April Friendly	Israel	2–1	Argentina	Jerusalem, Israel
	Ghrayib 63'; Revivo 82'	Report	Cagna 77'	Stadium: Teddy Stadium; Attendance: 14,000; Referee: Kostas Kapitanis (Cyprus)

17 May Friendly	Latvia	1–5	Israel	Riga, Latvia
18:00 UTC+3	Lobaņovs 84'	Report	Nimni 16'; Talesnikov 23'; Ghrayib 31'; Tubi 63'; Mizrahi 79'	Stadium: Daugava Stadium; Attendance: 2,000; Referee: Ihor Yarmenchuk (Ukraine)

18 August Friendly	Poland	2–0	Israel	Kraków, Poland
17:30 UTC+2	Treciak 23'; Siadaczka 71'	Report		Stadium: Stadion Miejski; Attendance: 3,000; Referee: Václav Krondl (Czech Republic)

5 September UEFA Euro 2000 qualifying	Austria	1–1	Israel	Vienna, Austria
20:30 UTC+2	Reinmayr 7'	Report	Nimni 68' (pen.)	Stadium: Ernst Happel Stadion; Attendance: 20,000; Referee: Anders Frisk (Sweden)

10 October UEFA Euro 2000 qualifying	San Marino	0–5	Israel	Serravalle, San Marino
20:30 UTC+2		Report	Revivo 16'; Nimni 18'; Mizrahi 32'; M.Valentini 58' (o.g.); Grayeb 82'	Stadium: Stadio Olimpico; Attendance: 872; Referee: Asim Khudiev (Azerbaijan)

14 October UEFA Euro 2000 qualifying	Israel	1–2	Spain	Ramat Gan, Israel
19:30 UTC+2	Hazan 64'	Report	Hierro 65'; Etxeberria 78'	Stadium: Ramat Gan Stadium; Attendance: 37,000; Referee: David Elleray (England)

18 November Friendly	Portugal	2–0	Israel	Setúbal, Portugal
	Couto 6'; Simão 89'	Report		Stadium: Estádio do Bonfim; Attendance: 13,000; Referee: Roelof Luinge (Netherlands)

23 December Friendly	Israel	2–0	FR Yugoslavia	Ramat Gan, Israel
18:00 UTC+2	Tal 57'; Abukasis 83'	Report		Stadium: Ramat Gan Stadium; Attendance: 11,000; Referee: Muhittin Boşat (Turkey)

== 1999 ==
18 January IFA 70th Anniversary Tournament	Israel	7–0	Estonia	Ramat Gan, Israel
	Nimni 17' (pen.); Tikva 29'; Harazi 31', 36'; Mizrahi 43'; Shitrit 81'; Talesnikov 87'	Report		Stadium: Ramat Gan Stadium; Attendance: 800; Referee: Laurent Duhamel (France)

20 January IFA 70th Anniversary Tournament	Israel	0–1	Norway	Ramat Gan, Israel
18:30 UTC+2		Report	Skammelsrud 67'	Stadium: Ramat Gan Stadium; Attendance: 4,000; Referee: Pierluigi Collina (Italy)

9 February Friendly	Israel	2–1	Belarus	Haifa, Israel
18:30 UTC+2	Nimni 20', 51'	Report	Baranaw 28'	Stadium: Kiryat Eliezer Stadium; Attendance: 7,500; Referee: Sorin Corpodean (Romania)

24 February Friendly	Israel	2–0	Latvia	Jerusalem, Israel
18:30 UTC+2	Revivo 21'; Harazi 27'	Report		Stadium: Teddy Stadium; Attendance: 6,000; Referee: Edgar Steinborn (Germany)

10 March Friendly	Romania	0–2	Israel	Bucharest, Romania
		Report	Harazi 18'; Badir 63'	Stadium: Stadionul Steaua; Attendance: 8,000; Referee: Kamen Aleksiev (Bulgaria)

28 March UEFA Euro 2000 qualifying	Israel	3–0	Cyprus	Ramat Gan, Israel
18:00 UTC+2	Banin 11'; Mizrahi 48', 53'	Report		Stadium: Ramat Gan Stadium; Attendance: 30,000; Referee: Marcel Lică (Romania)

6 June UEFA Euro 2000 qualifying	Israel	5–0	Austria	Ramat Gan, Israel
18:30 UTC+3	Berkovich 26', 47'; Revivo 46'; Mizrahi 53'; Grayeb 75'	Report		Stadium: Ramat Gan Stadium; Attendance: 42,000; Referee: Ľuboš Micheľ (Slovakia)

18 August Friendly	Slovakia	1–0	Israel	Bratislava, Slovakia
20:15 UTC+2	Fabuš 80'	Report		Stadium: Štadión Pasienky; Attendance: 2,368; Referee: Anton Getsov (Bulgaria)

5 September UEFA Euro 2000 qualifying	Cyprus	3–2	Israel	Limassol, Cyprus
20:00 UTC+3	Engomitis 27'; Špoljarić 53', 86' (pen.)	Report	Badir 31'; Benayoun 82'	Stadium: Tsirion Stadium; Attendance: 12,000; Referee: Graham Barber (England)

8 September UEFA Euro 2000 qualifying	Israel	8–0	San Marino	Ramat Gan, Israel
18:00 UTC+2	Benayoun 25', 46', 70'; Mizrahi 38'; Revivo 40', 68'; Sivilia 84'; Abuksis 89'	Report		Stadium: Ramat Gan Stadium; Attendance: 25,078; Referee: Ilhami Kaplan (Turkey)

10 October UEFA Euro 2000 qualifying	Spain	3–0	Israel	Albacete, Spain
19:30 UTC+2	Morientes 30'; Martín 37'; Raúl 51'	Report		Stadium: Estadio Carlos Belmonte; Attendance: 16,100; Referee: Hellmut Krug (Germany)

13 November UEFA Euro 2000 qualifying play-offs	Israel	0–5	Denmark	Ramat Gan, Israel
20:05 UTC+2		Report	Tomasson 2', 34'; Tøfting 67'; Jørgensen 68'; Steen Nielsen 73'	Stadium: Ramat Gan Stadium; Attendance: 42,000; Referee: David Elleray (England)

17 November UEFA Euro 2000 qualifying play-offs	Denmark	3–0 (8–0 agg.)	Israel	Copenhagen, Denmark
19:15 UTC+1	Sand 4'; Steen Nielsen 14'; Tomasson 64'	Report		Stadium: Parken Stadium; Attendance: 41,186; Referee: Vítor Melo Pereira (Portugal)

== 2000 ==
23 February Friendly	Israel	4–1	Russia	Haifa, Israel
18:00 UTC+2	Badir 3', 36'; Udi 16'; Nimni 86'	Report	Beschastnykh 58'	Stadium: Kiryat Eliezer Stadium; Attendance: 11,500; Referee: Andreas Georgiou (Cyprus)

29 March Friendly	Israel	1–1	Georgia	Ashkelon, Israel
	Berkovic 82'	Report	Kiknadze 27'	Stadium: Sala Stadium; Attendance: 8,000; Referee: Metin Tokat (Turkey)

26 April Friendly	Czech Republic	4–1	Israel	Prague, Czech Republic
20:30 UTC+2	Nedvěd 14', 56'; Koller 37'; Wagner 90'	Report	Brkovic 81'	Stadium: Stadion Letná; Attendance: 4,972; Referee: Marczyk Zbigniew (Poland)

3 June Friendly	Hungary	2–1	Israel	Budapest, Hungary
18:00 UTC+2	Illés 47'; Horváth 52'	Report	Balili 90'	Stadium: Fáy utcai Stadion; Attendance: 4,000; Referee: Željko Širić (Croatia)

16 August Friendly	Russia	1–0	Israel	Moscow, Russia
19:00 UTC+4	Buznikin 82'	Report		Stadium: Luzhniki Stadium; Attendance: 13,000; Referee: Slavik Kazaryan (Armenia)

3 September 2002 FIFA World Cup qualification	Israel	2–0	Liechtenstein	Ramat Gan, Israel
20:20 UTC+3	Harazi 1'; Balili 79'	Report		Stadium: Ramat Gan Stadium; Attendance: 19,000; Referee: Richard O'Hanlon (Republic of Ireland)

7 October 2002 FIFA World Cup qualification	Spain	2–0	Israel	Madrid, Spain
21:30 UTC+2	Gerard 20'; Hierro 54'	Report		Stadium: Santiago Bernabéu Stadium; Attendance: 80,000; Referee: Claude Colombo (France)

11 October 2002 FIFA World Cup qualification	Israel	3–1	Bosnia and Herzegovina	Ramat Gan, Israel
20:25 UTC+2	Berkovich 12'; Abuksis 62'; Katan 76'	Report	Akrapović 48'	Stadium: Ramat Gan Stadium; Attendance: 30,000; Referee: Dick Jol (Netherlands)

15 November Friendly	Portugal	2–1	Israel	Braga, Portugal
21:00 UTC+0	Figo 48'; Costa 60'	Report	Benayoun 85'	Stadium: Estádio Municipal de Braga; Attendance: 20,000; Referee: Georgios Kasnaferis (Greece)

== 2001 ==
17 January Friendly	Israel	2–0	Uzbekistan	Beit Shean, Israel
	Talker 3'; Mizrahi 33'	Report		Stadium: Beit Shean Municipal Stadium; Attendance: 3,300; Referee: Ali Aydın (Turkey)

14 February Friendly	Israel	1–0	Moldova	Herzliya, Israel
	Keisi 35'	Report		Stadium: Herzliya Municipal Stadium; Attendance: 5,000; Referee: Andreas Georgiou (Cyprus)

28 March 2002 FIFA World Cup qualification	Austria	2–1	Israel	Vienna, Austria
20:30 UTC+2	Baur 9'; Herzog 41' (pen.)	Report	Baur 6' (o.g.)	Stadium: Ernst-Happel-Stadion; Attendance: 21,000; Referee: Alfredo Trentalange (Italy)

24 April Friendly	Georgia	3–2	Israel	Tbilisi, Georgia
	Ketsbaia 9', 36'; Arveladze 88'	Report	Mizrahi 16', 72'	Stadium: Boris Paichadze Dinamo Arena; Attendance: 8,000; Referee: Sergo Kvaratskhelia (Georgia)

2 June 2002 FIFA World Cup qualification	Liechtenstein	0–3	Israel	Vaduz, Liechtenstein
19:00 UTC+2		Report	Revivo 3'; Tal 7'; Nimni 18'	Stadium: Rheinpark; Attendance: 1,650; Referee: Lassin Isaksen (Faroe Islands)

6 June 2002 FIFA World Cup qualification	Israel	1–1	Spain	Ramat Gan, Israel
20:00 UTC+3	Revivo 4'	Report	Raúl 63'	Stadium: Ramat Gan Stadium; Attendance: 23,000; Referee: Anders Frisk (Sweden)

15 August Friendly	Lithuania	2–3	Israel	Kaunas, Lithuania
18:00 UTC+2	Jankauskas 42'; Poškus 54'	Report	Gershon 35'; Banin 71'; Nimni 87'	Stadium: Darius and Girėnas Stadium; Attendance: 3,500; Referee: Romāns Lajuks (Latvia)

1 September 2002 FIFA World Cup qualification	Bosnia and Herzegovina	0–0	Israel	Sarajevo, Bosnia and Herzegovina
20:15 UTC+2		Report		Stadium: Koševo City Stadium; Attendance: 7,700; Referee: Dieter Schoch (Switzerland)

27 October 2002 FIFA World Cup qualification	Israel	1–1	Austria	Ramat Gan, Israel
19:30 UTC+2	Gershon 55' (pen.)	Report	Herzog 90+1'	Stadium: Ramat Gan Stadium; Attendance: 40,000; Referee: Vítor Melo Pereira (Portugal)

== 2002 ==
13 February Friendly	Germany	7–1	Israel	Kaiserslautern, Germany
20:30 UTC+1	Klose 49', 51', 64'; Hamann 62'; Bierhoff 69'; Asamoah 74'; Ricken 77'	Report	Kahn 27' (o.g.)	Stadium: Fritz-Walter-Stadion; Attendance: 24,512; Referee: Steve Dunn (England)

17 April Friendly	Denmark	3–1	Israel	Copenhagen, Denmark
19:25 UTC+2	Heintze 4'; Dahl Tomasson 14'; Rommedahl 34'	Report	Nimni 90' (pen.)	Stadium: Parken Stadium; Attendance: 9,598; Referee: Jack van Hulten (Netherlands)

21 August Friendly	Lithuania	2–4	Israel	Kaunas, Lithuania
19:45 UTC+3	Fomenka 10'; Poškus 32'	Report	Afek 20', 64'; Zandberg 49'; Tal 74'	Stadium: Darius and Girėnas Stadium; Attendance: 3,000; Referee: Oleg Chykun (Belarus)

5 September Friendly	Luxembourg	0–5	Israel	Luxembourg City, Luxembourg
20:00 UTC+2		Report	Udi 1', 68'; Badir 24'; Keisi 79'; Benayoun 85'	Stadium: Stade Josy Barthel; Attendance: 1,354; Referee: Paul Allaerts (Belgium)

12 October UEFA Euro 2004 qualifying	Malta	0–2	Israel	Ta' Qali, Malta
19:00 UTC+2		Report	Balili 56'; Revivo 72'	Stadium: Ta' Qali National Stadium; Attendance: 3,163; Referee: Sergei Shebek (Ukraine)

20 November Friendly	Macedonia	2–3	Israel	Skopje, Macedonia
20:15 UTC+1	Vasoski 63'; Sedloski 90'	Report	Zandberg 19'; Nimni 28'; Bitton 90+4'	Stadium: City Park; Attendance: 7,000; Referee: Dejan Delević (FR Yugoslavia)

== 2003 ==
12 February Friendly	Israel	2–0	Armenia	Ramat Gan, Israel
18:00 UTC+2	Nimni 19'; Zandberg 62'	Report		Stadium: Ramat Gan Stadium; Attendance: 6,000; Referee: Alfredo Trentalange (Italy)

5 March Friendly	Israel	0–0	Moldova	Ramat Gan, Israel
		Report		Stadium: Ramat Gan Stadium; Attendance: 3,500; Referee: Paolo Bertini (Italy)

29 March UEFA Euro 2004 qualifying	Cyprus	1–1	Israel	Limassol, Cyprus
19:00 UTC+2	Rauffmann 61'	Report	Afek 2'	Stadium: Tsirion Stadium; Attendance: 9,000; Referee: Mike McCurry (Scotland)

2 April UEFA Euro 2004 qualifying	Israel	1–2	France	Palermo, Italy
20:45 UTC+2	Afek 2'	Report	Trezeguet 23'; Zidane 45'	Stadium: Renzo Barbera Stadium; Attendance: 2,455; Referee: Graham Barber (England)
Note: Israel were forced to play all home games away from Israel due to the ongoing violence regarding the Israeli–Palestinian conflict.

30 April UEFA Euro 2004 qualifying	Israel	2–0	Cyprus	Palermo, Italy
20:30 UTC+2	Badir 88'; Holtzman 90'	Report		Stadium: Renzo Barbera Stadium; Attendance: 300; Referee: Michal Benes (Czech Republic)
Note: Israel were forced to play all home games away from Israel due to the ongoing violence regarding the Israeli–Palestinian conflict.

7 June UEFA Euro 2004 qualifying	Israel	0–0	Slovenia	Antalya, Turkey
21:15 UTC+3		Report		Stadium: Atatürk Stadium; Attendance: 1,800; Referee: Massimo Busacca (Switzerland)
Note: Israel were forced to play all home games away from Israel due to the ongoing violence regarding the Israeli–Palestinian conflict.

20 August Friendly	Russia	1–2	Israel	Moscow, Russia
19:00 UTC+4	Semak 85'	Report	Nimni 52'; Balili 81'	Stadium: Lokomotiv Stadium; Attendance: 6,025; Referee: Ihor Ishchenko (Ukraine)

6 September UEFA Euro 2004 qualifying	Slovenia	3–1	Israel	Ljubljana, Slovenia
20:15 UTC+2	Šiljak 35'; Knavs 37'; Čeh 78'	Report	Revivo 69'	Stadium: Bežigrad Stadium; Attendance: 8,000; Referee: Herbert Fandel (Germany)

10 September UEFA Euro 2004 qualifying	Israel	2–2	Malta	Antalya, Turkey
18:00 UTC+3	Revivo 16'; Balili 79'	Report	Mifsud 51' (pen.); Carabott 52'	Stadium: Atatürk Stadium; Attendance: 1,300; Referee: Eric Blareau (Belgium)
Note: Israel were forced to play all home games away from Israel due to the ongoing violence regarding the Israeli–Palestinian conflict.

11 October UEFA Euro 2004 qualifying	France	3–0	Israel	Saint-Denis, France
20:45 UTC+2	Henry 9'; Trezeguet 24'; Boumsong 42'	Report		Stadium: Stade de France; Attendance: 57,009; Referee: Cosimo-Giancarlo Bolognino (Italy)

== 2004 ==
18 February Friendly	Israel	6–0	Azerbaijan	Ramat Gan, Israel
18:00	Arbeitman 9', 66', 69'; Tal 25' (pen.); Katan 45+2', 61'	Report		Stadium: Ramat Gan Stadium; Attendance: 12,250; Referee: Paulo Paraty (Portugal)

30 March Friendly	Israel	2–1	Lithuania	Ramat Gan, Israel
18:00	Balili 35'; Badir 64'	Report	Ben Haim 44' (o.g.)	Stadium: Ramat Gan Stadium; Attendance: 9,782; Referee: Stuart Dougal (Scotland)

28 April Friendly	Israel	1–1	Moldova	Ramat Gan, Israel
18:00	Covalenco 33' (o.g.)	Report	Rogaciov 71'	Stadium: Ramat Gan Stadium; Attendance: 4,796; Referee: Sorin Corpodean (Romania)

27 May Friendly	Georgia	0–1	Israel	Tbilisi, Georgia
18:00 UTC+5		Report	Badir 33'	Stadium: Lokomotiv Stadium; Attendance: 23,000; Referee: Oleh Oriekhov (Ukraine)

18 August Friendly	Croatia	1–0	Israel	Varaždin, Croatia
20:15 UTC+2	Šimunić 29'	Report		Stadium: Stadion Varteks; Attendance: 8,000; Referee: Jacek Granat (Poland)

4 September 2006 FIFA World Cup qualification	France	0–0	Israel	Saint-Denis, France
21:00		(Report)		Stadium: Stade de France; Attendance: 43,527; Referee: René Temmink (Netherlands)

8 September 2006 FIFA World Cup qualification	Israel	2–1	Cyprus	Ramat Gan, Israel
20:50	Benayoun 64'; Badir 75'	(Report)	Konstantinou 59'	Stadium: Ramat Gan Stadium; Attendance: 21,872; Referee: Sergey Shmolik (Belarus)

9 October 2006 FIFA World Cup qualification	Israel	2–2	Switzerland	Ramat Gan, Israel
20:05	Benayoun 9', 48'	(Report)	Frei 26'; Vonlanthen 34'	Stadium: Ramat Gan Stadium; Attendance: 37,976; Referee: Mark Shield (Australia)

17 November 2006 FIFA World Cup qualification	Cyprus	1–2	Israel	Nicosia, Cyprus
19:00	Okkas 45'	(Report)	Keisi 17'; Nimni 86'	Stadium: GSP Stadium; Attendance: 1,624; Referee: Sten Kaldma (Estonia)

== 2005 ==
9 February Friendly	Israel	3–3	Croatia	Jerusalem, Israel
19:00	Balili 39'; Benayoun 75'; Golan 85'	Report	Klasnić 15', 79'; Srna 56' (pen.)	Stadium: Teddy Stadium; Attendance: 4,000; Referee: Panikos Kailis (Cyprus)

26 March 2006 FIFA World Cup qualification	Israel	1–1	Republic of Ireland	Ramat Gan, Israel
19:50	Abbas Souan 90'	(Report)	Morrison 43'	Stadium: Ramat Gan Stadium; Attendance: 32,150; Referee: Valentin Ivanov (Russia)

30 March 2006 FIFA World Cup qualification	Israel	1–1	France	Ramat Gan, Israel
20:50	Badir 83'	(Report)	Trézéguet 50'	Stadium: Ramat Gan Stadium; Attendance: 32,150; Referee: Markus Merk (Germany)

4 June 2006 FIFA World Cup qualification	Republic of Ireland	2–2	Israel	Dublin, Republic of Ireland
19:30	Harte 5'; Keane 11'	(Report)	Avi Yehiel 39'; Avi Nimni 45+1'	Stadium: Lansdowne Road; Attendance: 36,000; Referee: Kyros Vassaras (Greece)

15 August Valeriy Lobanovskyi Memorial Tournament	Ukraine	0–0 (3–5 p)	Israel	Kyiv, Ukraine
21:00		Report		Stadium: Valeriy Lobanovskyi Dynamo Stadium; Attendance: 7,000; Referee: Tomasz Mikulski (Poland)
	Penalties
	Gusin (penalty missed); Tymoshchuk (penalty scored); Rotan (penalty scored); Husyev (penalty scored)		Gershon (penalty scored); Tuama (penalty scored); Suan (penalty scored); Harazi (penalty scored); Keisi (penalty scored)

17 August Valeriy Lobanovskyi Memorial Tournament	Poland	3–2	Israel	Kyiv, Ukraine
21:00	Szymkowiak 19'; Rasiak 77', 89'	Report	Badir 35'; Katan 48'	Stadium: Valeriy Lobanovskyi Dynamo Stadium; Attendance: 3,500; Referee: Milan Karadzic (Serbia and Montenegro)

3 September 2006 FIFA World Cup qualification	Switzerland	1–1	Israel	Basel, Switzerland
17:30	Frei 6'	(Report)	Keisi 20'	Stadium: St. Jakob-Park; Attendance: 30,000; Referee: Roberto Rosetti (Italy)

7 September 2006 FIFA World Cup qualification	Faroe Islands	0–2	Israel	Tórshavn, Faroe Islands
18:00		(Report)	Nimni 54'; Katan 79'	Stadium: Tórsvøllur; Attendance: 2,240; Referee: Pieter Vink (Netherlands)

8 October 2006 FIFA World Cup qualification	Israel	2–1	Faroe Islands	Ramat Gan, Israel
21:10	Benayoun 1'; Zandberg 90+1'	(Report)	Samuelsen 90+3'	Stadium: Ramat Gan Stadium; Attendance: 31,857; Referee: Bernhard Brugger (Austria)

== 2006 ==
1 March Friendly	Israel	0–2	Denmark	Ramat Gan, Israel
19:50 UTC+2		Report	Perez 7'; Skoubo 19'	Stadium: Ramat Gan Stadium; Attendance: 15,762; Referee: Peter Sippel (Germany)

15 August Friendly	Slovenia	1–1	Israel	Celje, Slovenia
20:00 UTC+2	Šukalo 83'	Report	Benayoun 80'	Stadium: Arena Petrol; Attendance: 2,500; Referee: Pavel Královec (Czech Republic)

2 September UEFA Euro 2008 qualifying	Estonia	0–1	Israel	Tallinn, Estonia
21:30 UTC+3		Report	Colautti 8'	Stadium: A Le Coq Arena; Attendance: 7,800; Referee: Johan Verbist (Belgium)

6 September UEFA Euro 2008 qualifying	Israel	4–1	Andorra	Nijmegen, Netherlands
19:00 UTC+2	Benayoun 9'; Ben-Shushan 11'; Gershon 43' (pen.); Tamuz 69'	Report	Fernandez 84'	Stadium: Stadion de Goffert; Attendance: 400; Referee: Sinisa Zrnic (Bosnia and Herzegovina)
Note: Due to the 2006 Israel-Lebanon conflict, UEFA ordered that no matches in its competitions could be held in Israel until further notice. UEFA was scheduled to reconsider its ban on 14 September. On 15 September, UEFA lifted its ban on matches in Israel, returning to its previous policy of restricting Israel home matches to the Tel Aviv area. Ramat Gan Stadium in Ramat Gan is within the allowed area.

7 October UEFA Euro 2008 qualifying	Russia	1–1	Israel	Moscow, Russia
19:00 UTC+4	Arshavin 5'	Report	Ben-Shushan 84'	Stadium: Dynamo Stadium; Attendance: 22,000; Referee: Florian Meyer (Germany)

15 November UEFA Euro 2008 qualifying	Israel	3–4	Croatia	Ramat Gan, Israel
19:00 UTC+2	Colautti 8', 89'; Benayoun 68'	Report	Srna 35' (pen.); Eduardo 39', 54', 72'	Stadium: Ramat Gan Stadium; Attendance: 35,000; Referee: Eduardo Iturralde González (Spain)

== 2007 ==
7 February Friendly	Israel	1–1	Ukraine	Ramat Gan, Israel
18:30 UTC+2	Badir 38'	Report	Kalynychenko 74'	Stadium: Ramat Gan Stadium; Attendance: 12,000; Referee: Julián Rodríguez Santiago (Spain)

24 March UEFA Euro 2008 qualifying	Israel	0–0	England	Ramat Gan, Israel
20:30 UTC+2		Report		Stadium: Ramat Gan Stadium; Attendance: 38,000; Referee: Tom Henning Øvrebø (Norway)

28 March UEFA Euro 2008 qualifying	Israel	4–0	Estonia	Ramat Gan, Israel
20:30 UTC+3	Tal 19'; Colautti 29'; Sahar 77', 80'	Report		Stadium: Ramat Gan Stadium; Attendance: 23,658; Referee: Cüneyt Çakır (Turkey)

2 June UEFA Euro 2008 qualifying	Macedonia	1–2	Israel	Skopje, Macedonia
19:30 UTC+2	Stojkov 13'	Report	Yitzhaki 11'; Colautti 44'	Stadium: Skopje City Stadium; Attendance: 12,000; Referee: Knut Kircher (Germany)

6 June UEFA Euro 2008 qualifying	Andorra	0–2	Israel	Andorra la Vella, Andorra
18:00 UTC+2		Report	Tamuz 37'; Colautti 53'	Stadium: Estadi Comunal; Attendance: 618; Referee: Ian Stokes (Ireland)

22 August Friendly	Belarus	2–1	Israel	Minsk, Belarus
21:00 UTC+3	Vasilyuk 3'; Romaschenko 90+2'	Report	Gershon 29' (pen.)	Stadium: Dinamo Stadium; Attendance: 10,500; Referee: Paulius Malžinskas (Lithuania)

8 September UEFA Euro 2008 qualifying	England	3–0	Israel	London, England
17:00 UTC+1	Wright-Phillips 20'; Owen 49'; Richards 66'	Report		Stadium: Wembley Stadium; Attendance: 85,372; Referee: Pieter Vink (Netherlands)

13 October UEFA Euro 2008 qualifying	Croatia	1–0	Israel	Zagreb, Croatia
20:15 UTC+2	Eduardo 52'	Report		Stadium: Maksimir Stadium; Attendance: 30,084; Referee: Wolfgang Stark (Germany)

17 October Friendly	Israel	2–1	Belarus	Ramat Gan, Israel
20:45 UTC+3	Baruchyan 37'; Balili 71'	Report	Romaschenko 65'	Stadium: Ramat Gan Stadium; Attendance: 4,362; Referee: Tsvetan Georgiev (Bulgaria)

17 November UEFA Euro 2008 qualifying	Israel	2–1	Russia	Ramat Gan, Israel
17:00 UTC+1	Barda 10'; Golan 90+1'	Report	Bilyaletdinov 61'	Stadium: Ramat Gan Stadium; Attendance: 27,563; Referee: Stefano Farina (Italy)

21 November UEFA Euro 2008 qualifying	Israel	1–0	Macedonia	Ramat Gan, Israel
19:00 UTC+2	Barda 35'	Report		Stadium: Ramat Gan Stadium; Attendance: 2,736; Referee: Tomasz Mikulski (Poland)

== 2008 ==
6 February Friendly	Israel	1–0	Romania	Ramat Gan, Israel
20:45 UTC+2	Golan 25'	Report		Stadium: Ramat Gan Stadium; Attendance: 6,300; Referee: Duarte Gomes (Portugal)

26 March Friendly	Israel	1–0	Chile	Ramat Gan, Israel
16:00 UTC+2	Benayoun 30'	Report		Stadium: Ramat Gan Stadium; Attendance: 24,463; Referee: Carlos Velasco Carballo (Spain)

20 August Friendly	Finland	2–0	Israel	Tampere, Finland
19:00 UTC+3	Johansson 42', 88'	Report		Stadium: Tampere Stadium; Attendance: 4,929; Referee: Johannes Valgeirsson (Iceland)

6 September 2010 FIFA World Cup qualification	Israel	2–2	Switzerland	Ramat Gan, Israel
20:55 UTC+3	Benayoun 73'; Sahar 90+2'	Report	Yakin 45'; Nkufo 56'	Stadium: Ramat Gan Stadium; Attendance: 29,600; Referee: Martin Hansson (Sweden)

10 September 2010 FIFA World Cup qualification	Moldova	1–2	Israel	Chişinău, Moldova
20:30 UTC+3	Picusceac 1'	Report	Golan 39'; Saban 45'	Stadium: Zimbru Stadium; Attendance: 10,500; Referee: César Muñiz Fernández (Spain)

11 October 2010 FIFA World Cup qualification	Luxembourg	1–3	Israel	Luxembourg City, Luxembourg
20:15 UTC+2	Peters 14'	Report	Benayoun 2' (pen.); Golan 54'; Tuama 81'	Stadium: Stade Josy Barthel; Attendance: 3,562; Referee: Igor Egorov (Russia)

15 October 2010 FIFA World Cup qualification	Latvia	1–1	Israel	Riga, Latvia
19:00 UTC+3	Koļesņičenko 89'	Report	Benayoun 50'	Stadium: Skonto Stadions; Attendance: 7,100; Referee: Vladimír Hriňák (Slovakia)

19 November Friendly	Israel	2–2	Ivory Coast	Ramat Gan, Israel
19:00 UTC+2	Barda 18'; Golan 24'	Report	Strool 32' (o.g.); Sanogo 85'	Stadium: Ramat Gan Stadium; Attendance: 6,300; Referee: Matteo Trefoloni (Italy)

== 2009 ==
11 February Friendly	Israel	1–0	Hungary	Ramat Gan, Israel
19:00 UTC+2	Benayoun 77'	Report		Stadium: Ramat Gan Stadium; Attendance: 9,211; Referee: Marcin Borski (Poland)

28 March 2010 FIFA World Cup qualification	Israel	1–1	Greece	Ramat Gan, Israel
21:00 UTC+2	Golan 55'	Report	Gekas 42'	Stadium: Ramat Gan Stadium; Attendance: 38,000; Referee: Roberto Rosetti (Italy)

1 April 2010 FIFA World Cup qualification	Greece	2–1	Israel	Heraklion, Greece
21:30 UTC+3	Salpingidis 32'; Samaras 67' (pen.)	Report	Barda 60'	Stadium: Pankritio Stadium; Attendance: 22,794; Referee: Olegário Benquerença (Portugal)

12 August Friendly	Northern Ireland	1–1	Israel	Belfast, Northern Ireland
19:45 UTC+0	McCann 18'	Report	Barda 26'	Stadium: Windsor Park; Attendance: 10,250; Referee: Johannes Valgeirsson (Iceland)

5 September 2010 FIFA World Cup qualification	Israel	0–1	Latvia	Ramat Gan, Israel
21:00 UTC+3		Report	Gorkšs 59'	Stadium: Ramat Gan Stadium; Attendance: 20,000; Referee: Knut Kircher (Germany)

9 September 2010 FIFA World Cup qualification	Israel	7–0	Luxembourg	Ramat Gan, Israel
21:00 UTC+3	Barda 9', 21', 43'; Baruchyan 15'; Golan 58'; Sahar 62', 84'	Report		Stadium: Ramat Gan Stadium; Attendance: 7,038; Referee: Michael Svendsen (Denmark)

10 October 2010 FIFA World Cup qualification	Israel	3–1	Moldova	Ramat Gan, Israel
21:00 UTC+2	Barda 22', 70'; Ben Dayan 65'	Report	Calincov 90+2'	Stadium: Ramat Gan Stadium; Attendance: 8,700; Referee: Kevin Blom (Netherlands)

14 October 2010 FIFA World Cup qualification	Switzerland	0–0	Israel	Basel, Switzerland
20:00 UTC+2		Report		Stadium: St. Jakob-Park; Attendance: 38,500; Referee: Alexandru Tudor (Romania)

== 2010 ==
3 March Friendly	Romania	0–2	Israel	Timișoara, Romania
21:30 UTC+2		Report	Benayoun 45'; Barda 85'	Stadium: Stadionul Dan Păltinișanu; Attendance: 16,000; Referee: Milorad Mažić (Serbia)

26 May Friendly	Uruguay	4–1	Israel	Montevideo, Uruguay
20:30 UTC-3	Forlán 15'; Pereira 34'; Abreu 75', 81'	Report	Refaelov 30'	Stadium: Estadio Centenario; Attendance: 47,734; Referee: Enrique Osses (Chile)

30 May Friendly	Chile	3–0	Israel	Concepción, Chile
22:00 UTC-4	Suazo 19'; Sánchez 49'; Tello 90'	Report		Stadium: Estadio Municipal de Concepción; Attendance: 25,000; Referee: Antonio Arias (Paraguay)

2 September UEFA Euro 2012 qualification	Israel	3–1	Malta	Ramat Gan, Israel
21:15 UTC+3	Benayoun 7', 64' (pen.), 75'	Report	Pace 38'	Stadium: Ramat Gan Stadium; Attendance: 17,365; Referee: Saïd Ennjimi (France)

7 September UEFA Euro 2012 qualification	Georgia	0–0	Israel	Tbilisi, Georgia
21:00 UTC+4		Report		Stadium: Boris Paichadze Stadium; Attendance: 45,000; Referee: Sascha Kever (Switzerland)

9 October UEFA Euro 2012 qualification	Israel	1–2	Croatia	Ramat Gan, Israel
20:30 UTC+3	Shechter 81'	Report	Kranjčar 36' (pen.), 41'	Stadium: Ramat Gan Stadium; Attendance: 33,421; Referee: Wolfgang Stark (Germany)

12 October UEFA Euro 2012 qualification	Greece	2–1	Israel	Piraeus, Greece
21:45 UTC+3	Salpingidis 22'; Karagounis 63' (pen.)	Report	Spyropoulos 59' (o.g.)	Stadium: Karaiskakis Stadium; Attendance: 16,935; Referee: Martin Hansson (Sweden)

17 November Friendly	Israel	3–2	Iceland	Tel Aviv, Israel
20:35	Damari 5', 14'; Refaelov 27'	Report	Finnbogason 79'; Sigþórsson 85'	Stadium: Bloomfield Stadium; Attendance: 8,142; Referee: Ilias Spathas (Greece)

== 2011 ==
9 February Friendly	Israel	0–2	Serbia	Tel Aviv, Israel
20:00 UTC+2		Report	Tošić 23'; Trivunović 76'	Stadium: Bloomfield Stadium; Attendance: 7,783; Referee: Alexey Nikolaev (Russia)

26 March UEFA Euro 2012 qualification	Israel	2–1	Latvia	Tel Aviv, Israel
21:00 UTC+2	Barda 16'; Kayal 81'	Report	Gorkšs 62'	Stadium: Bloomfield Stadium; Attendance: 10,801; Referee: Milorad Mažić (Serbia)

29 March UEFA Euro 2012 qualification	Israel	1–0	Georgia	Tel Aviv, Israel
21:05 UTC+2	Ben Haim II 59'	Report		Stadium: Bloomfield Stadium; Attendance: 13,716; Referee: Fredy Fautrel (France)

4 June UEFA Euro 2012 qualification	Latvia	1–2	Israel	Riga, Latvia
19:30 UTC+3	Cauņa 62' (pen.)	Report	Benayoun 19'; Ben Haim I 43' (pen.)	Stadium: Skonto Stadium; Attendance: 6,147; Referee: Alan Kelly (Republic of Ireland)

10 August Friendly	Ivory Coast	4–3	Israel	Geneva, Switzerland
19:30 UTC+2	Touré 44'; Ya Konan 45+3'; Kone 67'; Drogba 81' (pen.)	Report	Shechter 76'; Melikson	Stadium: Stade de Genève; Attendance: 2,000; Referee: Jérôme Laperrière (Switzerland)

2 September UEFA Euro 2012 qualification	Israel	0–1	Greece	Tel Aviv, Israel
16:05 UTC+3		Report	Ninis 60'	Stadium: Bloomfield Stadium; Attendance: 13,100; Referee: Craig Thomson (Scotland)

6 September UEFA Euro 2012 qualification	Croatia	3–1	Israel	Zagreb, Croatia
20:00 UTC+2	Modrić 47'; Eduardo 55', 57'	Report	Hemed 44'	Stadium: Stadion Maksimir; Attendance: 13,688; Referee: Carlos Velasco Carballo (Spain)

11 October UEFA Euro 2012 qualification	Malta	0–2	Israel	Ta'Qali, Malta
19:00 UTC+2		Report	Refaelov 11'; Gershon 90+3'	Stadium: Ta'Qali Stadium; Attendance: 2,614; Referee: Bruno Paixão (Portugal)

== 2012 ==
29 February Friendly	Israel	2–3	Ukraine	Petah Tikva, Israel
19:00 UTC+2	Hemed 55' (pen.); Sahar 63'	Report	Husyev 17' (pen.); Konoplyanka 45'; Yarmolenko 61'	Stadium: HaMoshava Stadium; Attendance: 4,000; Referee: Szymon Marciniak (Poland)

26 May Friendly	Czech Republic	2–1	Israel	Hartberg, Austria
20:15 UTC+2	Baroš 17'; Lafata 90+4'	Report	Shechter 45+1'	Stadium: Stadion Hartberg; Attendance: 1,500; Referee: Richard Trutz (Austria)

31 May Friendly	Germany	2–0	Israel	Leipzig, Germany
20:30 UTC+2	Gomez 40'; Schürrle 82'	Report		Stadium: Red Bull Arena; Attendance: 43,241; Referee: Kevin Blom (Netherlands)

15 August Friendly	Hungary	1–1	Israel	Budapest, Hungary
20:30 UTC+2	Dzsudzsák 51'	Report	Hemed 80'	Stadium: Ferenc Puskás Stadium; Attendance: 14,000; Referee: Ivan Kružliak (Slovakia)

7 September 2014 FIFA World Cup qualification	Azerbaijan	1–1	Israel	Baku, Azerbaijan
21:00 UTC+5	Abışov 65'	Report	Natcho 50'	Stadium: Tofiq Bahramov Republican Stadium; Attendance: 22,211; Referee: Matej Jug (Slovenia)

11 September 2014 FIFA World Cup qualification	Israel	0–4	Russia	Ramat Gan, Israel
20:00 UTC+3		Report	Kerzhakov 7', 64'; Kokorin 18'; Fayzulin 78'	Stadium: Ramat Gan Stadium; Attendance: 28,131; Referee: Mark Clattenburg (England)

12 October 2014 FIFA World Cup qualification	Luxembourg	0–6	Israel	Luxembourg City, Luxembourg
21:00 UTC+2		Report	Radi 4'; Ben Basat 12'; Hemed 27', 74', 90+1'; Melikson 61'	Stadium: Stade Josy Barthel; Attendance: 2,631; Referee: Leontios Trattou (Cyprus)

16 October 2014 FIFA World Cup qualification	Israel	3–0	Luxembourg	Ramat Gan, Israel
18:00 UTC+2	Hemed 13', 48'; Ben Basat 35'	Report		Stadium: Ramat Gan Stadium; Attendance: 20,400; Referee: Harald Lechner (Austria)

14 November Friendly	Israel	1–2	Belarus	Jerusalem, Israel
20:30 UTC+2	Damari 19'	Report	Kislyak 45'; Balanovich 46'	Stadium: Teddy Stadium; Attendance: 8,000; Referee: Simon Lee Evans (Wales)

== 2013 ==
6 February Friendly	Israel	2–1	Finland	Netanya, Israel
20:00 UTC+2	Ben Basat 2'; Refaelov 90+3'	Report	Forsell 87'	Stadium: Netanya Stadium; Attendance: 6,150; Referee: Padraigh Sutton (Republic of Ireland)

22 March 2014 FIFA World Cup qualification	Israel	3–3	Portugal	Ramat Gan, Israel
14:45 UTC+2	Hemed 24'; Ben Basat 40'; Gershon 74'	Report	Alves 2'; Postiga 72'; Coentrão 90+3'	Stadium: Ramat Gan Stadium; Attendance: 38,600; Referee: Stéphane Lannoy (France)

26 March 2014 FIFA World Cup qualification	Northern Ireland	0–2	Israel	Belfast, Northern Ireland
19:45 UTC±0		Report	Refaelov 78'; Ben Basat 85'	Stadium: Windsor Park; Attendance: 11,200; Referee: Hannes Kaasik (Estonia)

2 June Friendly	Honduras	0–2	Israel	New York, United States
19:30 UTC-4		Report	Ezra 51'; Abuhatzira 76'	Stadium: Citi Field; Attendance: 26,170; Referee: Edvin Jurisevic (United States)

14 August Friendly	Ukraine	2–0	Israel	Kyiv, Ukraine
21:00 UTC+2	Rotan 29'; Seleznyov 72'	Report		Stadium: Olimpiyskiy National Sports Complex; Attendance: 25,637; Referee: Ivan Kružliak (Slovakia)

7 September 2014 FIFA World Cup qualification	Israel	1–1	Azerbaijan	Ramat Gan, Israel
20:45 UTC+3	Shechter 73'	Report	Amirguliyev 67'	Stadium: Ramat Gan Stadium; Attendance: 21,250; Referee: Stefan Johannesson (Sweden)

10 September 2014 FIFA World Cup qualification	Russia	3–1	Israel	Saint Petersburg, Russia
19:00 UTC+4	Berezutski 30'; Kokorin 52'; Glushakov 74'	Report	Zahavi 90+3'	Stadium: Petrovsky Stadium; Attendance: 21,170; Referee: Manuel Gräfe (Germany)

11 October 2014 FIFA World Cup qualification	Portugal	1–1	Israel	Lisbon, Portugal
20:45 UTC+1	Costa 27'	Report	Ben Basat 85'	Stadium: Estádio José Alvalade; Attendance: 48,317; Referee: Tom Harald Hagen (Norway)

15 October 2014 FIFA World Cup qualification	Israel	1–1	Northern Ireland	Ramat Gan, Israel
20:00 UTC+3	Ben Basat 43'	Report	Davis 72'	Stadium: Ramat Gan Stadium; Attendance: 12,785; Referee: Laurent Duhamel (France)

== 2014 ==
5 March Friendly	Israel	1–3	Slovakia	Netanya, Israel
19:30 UTC+2	Buzaglo 80'	Report	Jakubko 37'; Ďurica 69'; Mak 83'	Stadium: Netanya Stadium; Attendance: 6,500; Referee: Christian Dingert (Germany)

28 May Friendly	Mexico	3–0	Israel	Mexico City, Mexico
21:30 UTC-5	Layún 43', 62'; Fabián 85'	Report		Stadium: Estadio Azteca; Attendance: 80,000; Referee: Elmer Bonilla (El Salvador)

1 June Road to Brazil	Honduras	2–4	Israel	Houston, United States
20:00 UTC-5	Espinoza 47'; Costly 83'	Report	Zahavi 34'; Figueroa 53' (o.g.); Damari 60'; Vermouth 74'	Stadium: BBVA Compass Stadium; Attendance: 26,170; Referee: Kevin Morrison (Jamaica)

10 October UEFA Euro 2016 qualifying	Cyprus	1–2	Israel	Nicosia, Cyprus
20:45 (21:45 UTC+3)	Makrides 67'	Report	Damari 38'; Ben Haim II 45'	Stadium: GSP Stadium; Attendance: 19,164; Referee: Daniele Orsato (Italy)

13 October UEFA Euro 2016 qualifying	Andorra	1–4	Israel	Andorra la Vella, Andorra
20:45 (20:45 UTC+2)	Lima 15' (pen.)	Report	Damari 3', 41', 82'; Hemed 90+6' (pen.)	Stadium: Estadi Nacional; Attendance: 2,032; Referee: Cristian Balaj (Romania)

16 November UEFA Euro 2016 qualifying	Israel	3–0	Bosnia and Herzegovina	Haifa, Israel
20:45 (21:45 UTC+2)	Vermouth 36'; Damari 45'; Zahavi 70'	Report		Stadium: Sammy Ofer Stadium; Attendance: 28,300; Referee: Antonio Mateu Lahoz (Spain)

== 2015 ==
28 March UEFA Euro 2016 qualifying	Israel	0–3	Wales	Haifa, Israel
18:00 (20:00 UTC+3)		Report	Ramsey 45'; Bale 50', 77'	Stadium: Sammy Ofer Stadium; Attendance: 30,200; Referee: Milorad Mažić (Serbia)

31 March UEFA Euro 2016 qualifying	Israel	0–1	Belgium	Jerusalem, Israel
20:45 (21:45 UTC+3)		Report	Fellaini 9'	Stadium: Teddy Stadium; Attendance: 29,750; Referee: Mark Clattenburg (England)

12 June UEFA Euro 2016 qualifying	Bosnia and Herzegovina	3–1	Israel	Zenica, Bosnia and Herzegovina
20:45 (20:45 UTC+2)	Višća 42', 75'; Džeko 45+2' (pen.)	Report	Ben Haim II 41'	Stadium: Bilino Polje; Attendance: 12,100; Referee: Ruddy Buquet (France)

3 September UEFA Euro 2016 qualifying	Israel	4–0	Andorra	Haifa, Israel
20:45 (21:45 UTC+3)	Zahavi 3'; Bitton 22'; Hemed 26' (pen.); Dabour 38'	Report		Stadium: Sammy Ofer Stadium; Attendance: 22,650; Referee: Tamás Bognár (Hungary)

6 September UEFA Euro 2016 qualifying	Wales	0–0	Israel	Cardiff, Wales
18:00 (17:00 UTC+1)		Report		Stadium: Cardiff City Stadium; Attendance: 32,653; Referee: Ivan Bebek (Croatia)

10 October UEFA Euro 2016 qualifying	Israel	1–2	Cyprus	Jerusalem, Israel
20:45 (21:45 UTC+3)	Bitton 76'	Report	Júnior 58'; Demetriou 80'	Stadium: Teddy Stadium; Attendance: 25,300; Referee: Jorge Sousa (Portugal)

13 October UEFA Euro 2016 qualifying	Belgium	3–1	Israel	Brussels, Belgium
20:45 (20:45 UTC+2)	Mertens 64'; De Bruyne 78'; Hazard 84'	Report	Hemed 88'	Stadium: King Baudouin Stadium; Attendance: 39,773; Referee: Anastasios Sidiropoulos (Greece)

== 2016 ==
23 March Friendly	Croatia	2–0	Israel	Osijek, Croatia
18:00 (UTC+2)	Perišić 4'; Brozović 34'	Report		Stadium: Stadion Gradski vrt Attendance: 10,545; Referee: István Vad (Hungary)

31 May Friendly	Serbia	3–1	Israel	Novi Sad, Serbia
20:10 UTC+2	Ivanović 33'; Milunović 74'; Tadić 88'	Report	Zahavi 49' (pen.)	Stadium: Stadion Karađorđe; Attendance: 10,000; Referee: Sebastian Colțescu (Romania)

5 September 2018 FIFA World Cup qualification	Israel	1–3	Italy	Haifa, Israel
20:45 CEST (UTC+02:00)	Ben Haim 35'	Report (FIFA); Report (UEFA)	Pellè 14'; Candreva 31' (pen.); Immobile 83'	Stadium: Sammy Ofer Stadium; Attendance: 29,300; Referee: Sergei Karasev (Russia)

6 October 2018 FIFA World Cup qualification	Macedonia	1–2	Israel	Skopje, Macedonia
20:45 (20:45 UTC+2)	Nestorovski 63'	Report (FIFA); Report (UEFA)	Hemed 25'; Ben Haim II 43'	Stadium: Philip II Arena; Attendance: 6,500; Referee: Andre Marriner (England)

9 October 2018 FIFA World Cup qualification	Israel	2–1	Liechtenstein	Jerusalem, Israel
18:00 (19:00 UTC+3)	Hemed 4', 16'	Report (FIFA); Report (UEFA)	Göppel 49'	Stadium: Teddy Stadium; Attendance: 9,000; Referee: Clayton Pisani (Malta)

12 November 2018 FIFA World Cup qualification	Albania	0–3	Israel	Elbasan, Albania
20:45 (20:45 UTC+1)		Report (FIFA); Report (UEFA)	Zahavi 18' (pen.); Einbinder 66'; Atar 84'	Stadium: Elbasan Arena; Attendance: 7,600; Referee: Deniz Aytekin (Germany)

== 2017 ==
24 March 2018 FIFA World Cup qualification	Spain	4–1	Israel	Gijón, Spain
20:45 (20:45 UTC+1)	Silva 13'; Vitolo 45+1'; Costa 51'; Isco 88'	Report (FIFA); Report (UEFA)	Refaelov 76'	Stadium: El Molinón; Attendance: 20,321; Referee: Michael Oliver (England)

6 June Friendly	Israel	1–1	Moldova	Netanya, Israel
20:30 UTC+3	Sahar 90+5' (pen.)	Report	Gînsari 51'	Stadium: Netanya Stadium; Attendance: 5,000; Referee: Bastian Dankert (Germany)

11 June 2018 FIFA World Cup qualification	Israel	0–3	Albania	Haifa, Israel
20:45 (21:45 UTC+3)		Report (FIFA); Report (UEFA)	Sadiku 22', 44'; Memushaj 71'	Stadium: Sammy Ofer Stadium; Attendance: 15,150; Referee: Aleksei Kulbakov (Belarus)

2 September 2018 FIFA World Cup qualification	Israel	0–1	Macedonia	Haifa, Israel
20:45 (21:45 UTC+3)		Report (FIFA); Report (UEFA)	Pandev 73'	Stadium: Sammy Ofer Stadium; Attendance: 11,350; Referee: Aleksei Eskov (Russia)

5 September 2018 FIFA World Cup qualification	Italy	1–0	Israel	Reggio Emilia, Italy
20:45 (20:45 UTC+2)	Immobile 53'	Report (FIFA); Report (UEFA)		Stadium: Mapei Stadium; Attendance: 15,507; Referee: Benoît Bastien (France)

6 October 2018 FIFA World Cup qualification	Liechtenstein	0–1	Israel	Vaduz, Liechtenstein
20:45 (20:45 UTC+2)		Report (FIFA); Report (UEFA)	Tibi 22'	Stadium: Rheinpark Stadion; Attendance: 3,498; Referee: Arnold Hunter (Northern Ireland)

9 October 2018 FIFA World Cup qualification	Israel	0–1	Spain	Jerusalem, Israel
20:45 (21:45 UTC+3)		Report (FIFA); Report (UEFA)	Illarramendi 76'	Stadium: Teddy Stadium; Attendance: 28,700; Referee: Craig Thomson (Scotland)

== 2018 ==
24 March Friendly	Israel	1–2	Romania	Netanya, Israel
20:00 UTC+02:00	Hemed 60'	Report	Stanciu 64'; Țucudean 82'	Stadium: Netanya Stadium; Attendance: 7,925; Referee: Masias Dimitrios (Cyprus)

7 September 2018–19 UEFA Nations League	Albania	1–0	Israel	Elbasan, Albania
20:45 (20:45 UTC+2)	Xhaka 55'	Report		Stadium: Elbasan Arena; Attendance: 4,126; Referee: Viktor Kassai (Hungary)

11 September Friendly	Northern Ireland	3–0	Israel	Belfast, Northern Ireland
19:45 (21:45 UTC+3)	Davis 13'; Dallas 41'; Whyte 67'	Report		Stadium: Windsor Park; Attendance: 12,913; Referee: Bas Nijhuis (Netherlands)

11 October 2018–19 UEFA Nations League	Israel	2–1	Scotland	Haifa, Israel
20:45 (21:45 UTC+3)	Peretz 52'; Tierney 74' (o.g.)	Report	Mulgrew 24' (pen.)	Stadium: Sammy Ofer Stadium; Attendance: 10,290; Referee: Daniel Stefanski (Poland)

14 October 2018–19 UEFA Nations League	Israel	2–0	Albania	Be'er Sheva, Israel
20:45 (21:45 UTC+3)	Hemed 8'; Saba 83'	Report		Stadium: Turner Stadium; Attendance: 14,900; Referee: Paolo Mazzoleni (Italy)

15 November Friendly	Israel	7–0	Guatemala	Netanya, Israel
11:15 (20:15 UTC+2)	Zahavi 5'; Tawatha 27'; Dabour 37', 53'; Saba 62', 79'; Sahar 88' (pen.)	Report		Stadium: Netanya Stadium; Attendance: 5,900; Referee: Jérôme Brisard (France)

20 November 2018–19 UEFA Nations League	Scotland	3–2	Israel	Glasgow, Scotland
20:45 (19:45 UTC±0)	Forrest 34', 43', 64'	Report	Kayal 9'; Zahavi 75'	Stadium: Hampden Park; Attendance: 21,281; Referee: Tobias Welz (Germany)

== 2019 ==
21 March UEFA Euro 2020 qualifying	Israel	1–1	Slovenia	Haifa, Israel
21:45 (19:45 UTC±0)	Zahavi 55'	Report	Šporar 48'	Stadium: Sammy Ofer Stadium; Attendance: 12,430; Referee: Tiago Martins (Portugal)

24 March UEFA Euro 2020 qualifying	Israel	4–2	Austria	Haifa, Israel
19:00 (17:00 UTC±0)	Zahavi 34', 45', 55'; Dabour 66'	Report	Arnautović 8', 75'	Stadium: Sammy Ofer Stadium; Attendance: 16,180; Referee: Yevhen Aranovskyi (Ukraine)

7 June UEFA Euro 2020 qualifying	Latvia	0–3	Israel	Riga, Latvia
21:45 (18:45 UTC±0)		Report	Zahavi 10', 60', 81'	Stadium: Daugava Stadium, Attendance: 5,508; Referee: Sergey Ivanov (Russia)

10 June UEFA Euro 2020 qualifying	Poland	4–0	Israel	Warsaw, Poland
21:45 (18:45 UTC±0)	Piątek 35'; Lewandowski 56' (pen.); Grosicki 59'; Kądzior 84'	Report		Stadium: Stadion Narodowy; Attendance: 57,229; Referee: Tobias Stieler (Germany)

5 September UEFA Euro 2020 qualifying	Israel	1–1	North Macedonia	Be'er Sheva, Israel
21:45 (18:45 UTC±0)	Zahavi 55'	Report	Ademi 64'	Stadium: Turner Stadium; Attendance: 15,200; Referee: Andreas Ekberg (Sweden)

9 September UEFA Euro 2020 qualifying	Slovenia	3–2	Israel	Ljubljana, Slovenia
21:45 (18:45 UTC±0)	Verbič 43', 90'; Bezjak 66'	Report	Natcho 50'; Zahavi 63'	Stadium: Stožice Stadium; Attendance: 10,669; Referee: Anthony Taylor (England)

10 October UEFA Euro 2020 qualifying	Austria	3–1	Israel	Vienna, Austria
21:45 (18:45 UTC±0)	Lazaro 41'; Hinteregger 56'; Sabitzer 88'	Report	Zahavi 34'	Stadium: Ernst-Happel-Stadion; Attendance: 26,200; Referee: Willie Collum (Scotland)

15 October UEFA Euro 2020 qualifying	Israel	3–1	Latvia	Be'er Sheva, Israel
21:45 (18:45 UTC±0)	Dabour 16', 42'; Zahavi 26'	Report	Kamešs 40'	Stadium: Turner Stadium; Attendance: 9,150; Referee: Arnold Hunter (Northern Ireland)

16 November UEFA Euro 2020 qualifying	Israel	1–2	Poland	Jerusalem, Israel
21:45 (19:45 UTC±0)	Dabour 88'	Report	Krychowiak 4'; Piątek 54'	Stadium: Teddy Stadium; Attendance: 16,700; Referee: Mattias Gestranius (Finland)

19 November UEFA Euro 2020 qualifying	North Macedonia	1–0	Israel	Skopje, North Macedonia
21:45 (19:45 UTC±0)	Nikolov 45+2'	Report		Stadium: Philip II Arena; Attendance: 5,573; Referee: Paolo Valeri (Italy)

== See also ==
- Israel national football team results (2020–present)
- Israel national football team results (1960–1989)
- Israel national football team results (1934–1959)
