= 1988–89 Maccabi Haifa F.C. season =

Maccabi Haifa
1988–89 season
- Manager: (Israel) Amazzia Levkovic
- 1988–89 Liga Leumit: 1st
- State Cup: Runners-up
- Highest home attendance: 15,000 vs Hapoel Petah Tikva (13 May 1989)
- Lowest home attendance: 4,000 vs Hapoel Petah Tikva (24 September 1988)
- Average home league attendance: 7,633
Home colours

The 1988–89 season was Maccabi Haifa's 31st season in the Liga Leumit, and their 8th consecutive season in the top division of Israeli football.

The season was a great success for the club winning the league and coming extremely close to winning the State Cup to go with it.

== First Division ==
Date	Opponents	H / A	Result F – A	Scorers	Attendance
17 September 1988	Hapoel Kfar Saba	H	2 – 2	Mordechai, Merili	6,000
24 September 1988	Hapoel Petah Tikva	H	3 – 0	Givol, Mordechai, Armeli	4,000
1 October 1988	Shimshon Tel Aviv	A	2 – 1	Merili, Armeli	1,500
8 October 1988	Beitar Jerusalem	H	0 – 0		12,000
15 October 1988	Hapoel Be'er Sheva	A	0 – 0		7,000
22 October 1988	Hapoel Tiberias	H	2 – 1	Mizrahi, Atar	7,000
29 October 1988	Maccabi Tel Aviv	A	1 – 1	Armeli	8,000
5 November 1988	Beitar Tel Aviv	H	0 – 0		8,000
30 October 1988	Maccabi Netanya	A	3 – 1	Malka, Atar, Armeli	5,000
19 November 1988	Hapoel Jerusalem	H	1 – 1	Sayegh	6,500
26 November 1988	Hapoel Tel Aviv	A	4 – 1	Givol, Klinger, Atar, Armeli	2,000
3 December 1988	Bnei Yehuda	H	3 – 1	Atar, own goal, Klinger	8,000
9 December 1988	Zafririm Holon	A	1 – 1	Klinger	4,000
17 December 1988	Hapoel Kfar Saba	A	1 – 1	Givol	3,000
24 December 1988	Hapoel Petah Tikva	A	0 – 2		2,000
31 December 1988	Shimshon Tel Aviv	H	1 – 1	Armeli	6,000
7 January 1989	Beitar Jerusalem	A	2 – 2	Atar, Armeli	2,000
14 January 1989	Hapoel Be'er Sheva	H	0 – 0		6,000
21 January 1989	Hapoel Tiberias	A	3 – 0	Armeli, Mizrahi, Merili	2,000
28 January 1989	Maccabi Tel Aviv	H	5 – 0	Klinger (3), Mizrahi, Atar	6,000
4 February 1989	Beitar Tel Aviv	A	2 – 0	Merili, Klinger	10,000
11 February 1989	Maccabi Netanya	H	2 – 0	Givol, Armeli	12,000
18 February 1989	Hapoel Jerusalem	A	0 – 0		4,000
25 February 1989	Hapoel Tel Aviv	A	2 – 0	Technical Win	3,000
11 March 1989	Bnei Yehuda Tel Aviv	A	0 – 0		3,000
25 March 1989	Zafririm Holon	H	1 – 0	Armeli	5,000
22 April 1989	Hapoel Be'er Sheva	H	3 – 0	Klinger, Atar, Armeli	5,000
29 April 1989	Maccabi Netanya	A	2 – 0	Merili, Armeli	8,000
6 May 1989	Shimshon Tel Aviv	H	2 – 1	Mizrahi, Reuven Atar	8,000
13 May 1989	Hapoel Petah Tikva	H	1 – 1	Mizrahi	15,000
20 May 1989	Beitar Tel Aviv	A	0 – 1		3,000

== Squad statistics ==
Pos.	Name	League		State Cup		Toto Cup		Total	
Pos.	Name	Apps	Goals	Apps	Goals	Apps	Goals	Apps	Goals
GK	(Israel) Giora Antman	31	0	0	0	0	0	0	0
DF	(Israel) Eitan Aharoni	0	0	0	0	0	0	0	0
DF	(Israel) Marco Balbul	0	0	0	0	0	0	0	0
DF	(Argentina) Fabian Grimberg	0	0	0	0	0	0	0	0
DF	(Israel) David Levy	0	0	0	0	0	0	0	0
DF	(Israel) Zion Merili	0	0	0	0	0	0	0	0
DF	(Israel) Yossi Tsarfati	0	0	0	0	0	0	0	0
MF	(Israel) Avraham Abukarat	0	0	0	0	0	0	0	0
MF	(Israel) Reuven Atar	0	0	0	0	0	0	0	0
MF	(Israel) Yaron Givol	0	0	0	0	0	0	0	0
MF	(Israel) Nir Klinger	0	0	0	0	0	0	0	0
MF	(Israel) Yossi Kramer	0	0	0	0	0	0	0	0
MF	(Argentina) Fabian Lagman	0	0	0	0	0	0	0	0
FW	(Israel) Zahi Armeli	0	0	0	0	0	0	0	0
FW	(Israel) Avi Golder	0	0	0	0	0	0	0	0
FW	(Israel) Zadok Malka	0	0	0	0	0	0	0	0
FW	(Israel) Offer Mizrahi	0	0	0	0	0	0	0	0
FW	(Israel) Itai Mordechai	0	0	0	0	0	0	0	0
FW	(Israel) Raffi Osmo	0	0	0	0	0	0	0	0
FW	(Argentina) Patricio Sayegh	0	0	0	0	0	0	0	0
