= 2002 FIFA World Cup qualification – UEFA Group 7 =

Football tournament qualification stage

The five teams in this group played against each other on a home-and-away basis. The group winner Spain qualified for the 17th FIFA World Cup held in South Korea and Japan. The runner-up Austria advanced to the UEFA Play-off and played against Turkey. Spain dominated the group, with six wins out of eight, and only two away draws (against second-placed Austria and third-placed Israel) to mar the record. Second place, however, was not decided until the last minute of the last match: Austria had a three-point advantage, but Israel led 1-0 which would have brought them level in the group standings, and had a superior goal difference which would have seen them into second place, but Austria scored an injury-time equalizer to earn a draw and retain their second position.

== Standings ==
Pos	Team	Pld	W	D	L	GF	GA	GD	Pts	Qualification	Spain national football team	Austria national football team	Israel national football team	Bosnia and Herzegovina national football team	Liechtenstein national football team
1	Spain	8	6	2	0	21	4	+17	20	Qualification to 2002 FIFA World Cup	—	4–0	2–0	4–1	5–0
2	Austria	8	4	3	1	10	8	+2	15	Advance to UEFA play-offs	1–1	—	2–1	2–0	2–0
3	Israel	8	3	3	2	11	7	+4	12		1–1	1–1	—	3–1	2–0
4	Bosnia and Herzegovina	8	2	2	4	12	12	0	8		1–2	1–1	0–0	—	5–0
5	Liechtenstein	8	0	0	8	0	23	−23	0		0–2	0–1	0–3	0–3	—

== Matches ==
2 September 2000

Bosnia and Herzegovina	1–2	Spain
Baljić 41'	Report	Gerard 39'; Etxeberria 72'

Koševo, Sarajevo
Attendance: 28,700
Referee: Herbert Fandel (Germany)
3 September 2000

Israel	2–0	Liechtenstein
Mizrahi 1'; Balili 80'	Report

Ramat Gan Stadium, Ramat Gan
Attendance: 19,000
Referee: Richard O'Hanlon (Republic of Ireland)

7 October 2000

Spain	2–0	Israel
Gerard 20'; Hierro 54'	Report

Santiago Bernabéu, Madrid
Attendance: 80,000
Referee: Claude Colombo (France)
7 October 2000

Liechtenstein	0–1	Austria
	Report	Flögel 20'

Rheinpark, Vaduz
Attendance: 3,548
Referee: John Rowbotham (Scotland)

11 October 2000

Austria	1–1	Spain
Baur 22'	Report	Baraja 27'

Ernst-Happel-Stadion, Vienna
Attendance: 48,000
Referee: Valentin Ivanov (Russia)
11 October 2000

Israel	3–1	Bosnia and Herzegovina
Berkovich 12'; Abuksis 62'; Katan 76'	Report	Akrapović 48'

Ramat Gan Stadium, Ramat Gan
Attendance: 30,000
Referee: Dick Jol (Netherlands)

24 March 2001

Spain	5–0	Liechtenstein
Helguera 20'; Mendieta 36', 82'; Hierro 55' (pen.); Raúl 67'	Report

Estadio José Rico Pérez, Alicante
Attendance: 30,000
Referee: Darko Čeferin (Slovenia)
24 March 2001

Bosnia and Herzegovina	1–1	Austria
Barbarez 43'	Report	Baur 61'

Koševo, Sarajevo
Attendance: 25,000
Referee: Tom Henning Øvrebø (Norway)

28 March 2001

Austria	2–1	Israel
Baur 9'; Herzog 42' (pen.)	Report	Baur 6' (o.g.)

Ernst-Happel-Stadion, Vienna
Attendance: 21,000
Referee: Alfredo Trentalange (Italy)
28 March 2001

Liechtenstein	0–3	Bosnia and Herzegovina
	Report	Barbarez 10', 72'; Hota 89'

Rheinpark, Vaduz
Attendance: 3,400
Referee: Andrejs Sipailo (Latvia)

25 April 2001

Austria	2–0	Liechtenstein
Glieder 44'; Flögel 75'	Report

Tivoli-Neu, Innsbruck
Attendance: 13,060
Referee: David Malcolm (Northern Ireland)

2 June 2001

Spain	4–1	Bosnia and Herzegovina
Hierro 26'; Moreno 76'; Raúl 89'; Tristán 90'	Report	Bešlija 41'

Estadio Nuevo Carlos Tartiere, Oviedo
Attendance: 30,000
Referee: Roy Helge Olsen (Norway)
2 June 2001

Liechtenstein	0–3	Israel
	Report	Revivo 3'; Tal 7'; Nimni 18'

Rheinpark, Vaduz
Attendance: 1,650
Referee: Lassin Isaksen (Faeroe Islands)

6 June 2001

Israel	1–1	Spain
Revivo 4'	Report	Raúl 63'

Ramat Gan Stadium, Ramat Gan
Attendance: 23,000
Referee: Anders Frisk (Sweden)

1 September 2001

Spain	4–0	Austria
Tristán 45'; Morientes 79', 84'; Mendieta 90+1'	Report

Estadio Mestalla, Valencia
Attendance: 31,661
Referee: Horacio Elizondo (Argentina)
1 September 2001

Bosnia and Herzegovina	0–0	Israel
	Report

Koševo, Sarajevo
Attendance: 7,700
Referee: Dieter Schoch (Switzerland)

5 September 2001

Liechtenstein	0–2	Spain
	Report	Raúl 19'; Nadal 82'

Rheinpark, Vaduz
Attendance: 4,648
Referee: Ivan Dobrinov (Bulgaria)
5 September 2001

Austria	2–0	Bosnia and Herzegovina
Herzog 38', 87'	Report

Ernst-Happel-Stadion, Vienna
Attendance: 23,200
Referee: Graham Barber (England)

7 October 2001

Bosnia and Herzegovina	5–0	Liechtenstein
Konjić 33'; Baljić 45' (pen.), 82' (pen.); Šabić 69'; Dodik 85'	Report

Bilino Polje, Zenica
Attendance: 6,000
Referee: John McDermott (Republic of Ireland)

27 October 2001 (Note: The game was originally scheduled for 7 October 2001. On 4 October FIFA announced postponement of the match for safety reasons after a plane departed from Tel Aviv crashed in the Black Sea.)

Israel	1–1	Austria
Gershon 55' (pen.)	Report	Herzog 90+1'

Ramat Gan Stadium, Ramat Gan
Attendance: 40,000
Referee: Vítor Melo Pereira (Portugal)

== Goalscorers ==
There were 54 goals scored in 20 matches, for an average of 2.7 goals per match.

4 goals

- (Austria) Andi Herzog
- (Spain) Raúl

3 goals

- (Austria) Michael Baur
- (Bosnia and Herzegovina) Elvir Baljić
- (Bosnia and Herzegovina) Sergej Barbarez
- (Spain) Fernando Hierro
- (Spain) Gaizka Mendieta

2 goals

- (Austria) Thomas Flögel
- (Israel) Haim Revivo
- (Spain) Gerard López
- (Spain) Fernando Morientes
- (Spain) Diego Tristán

1 goal

- (Austria) Eduard Glieder
- (Bosnia and Herzegovina) Bruno Akrapović
- (Bosnia and Herzegovina) Mirsad Bešlija
- (Bosnia and Herzegovina) Marijo Dodik
- (Bosnia and Herzegovina) Almedin Hota
- (Bosnia and Herzegovina) Muhamed Konjić
- (Bosnia and Herzegovina) Nermin Šabić
- (Israel) Yossi Abuksis
- (Israel) Pini Balili
- (Israel) Eyal Berkovich
- (Israel) Shimon Gershon
- (Israel) Yaniv Katan
- (Israel) Alon Mizrahi
- (Israel) Avi Nimni
- (Israel) Idan Tal
- (Spain) Rubén Baraja
- (Spain) Joseba Etxeberria
- (Spain) Iván Helguera
- (Spain) Javi Moreno
- (Spain) Miguel Ángel Nadal

1 own goal

- (Austria) Michael Baur (against Israel)
