= David Levy (footballer) =

Israeli footballer

David Levy דוד לוי
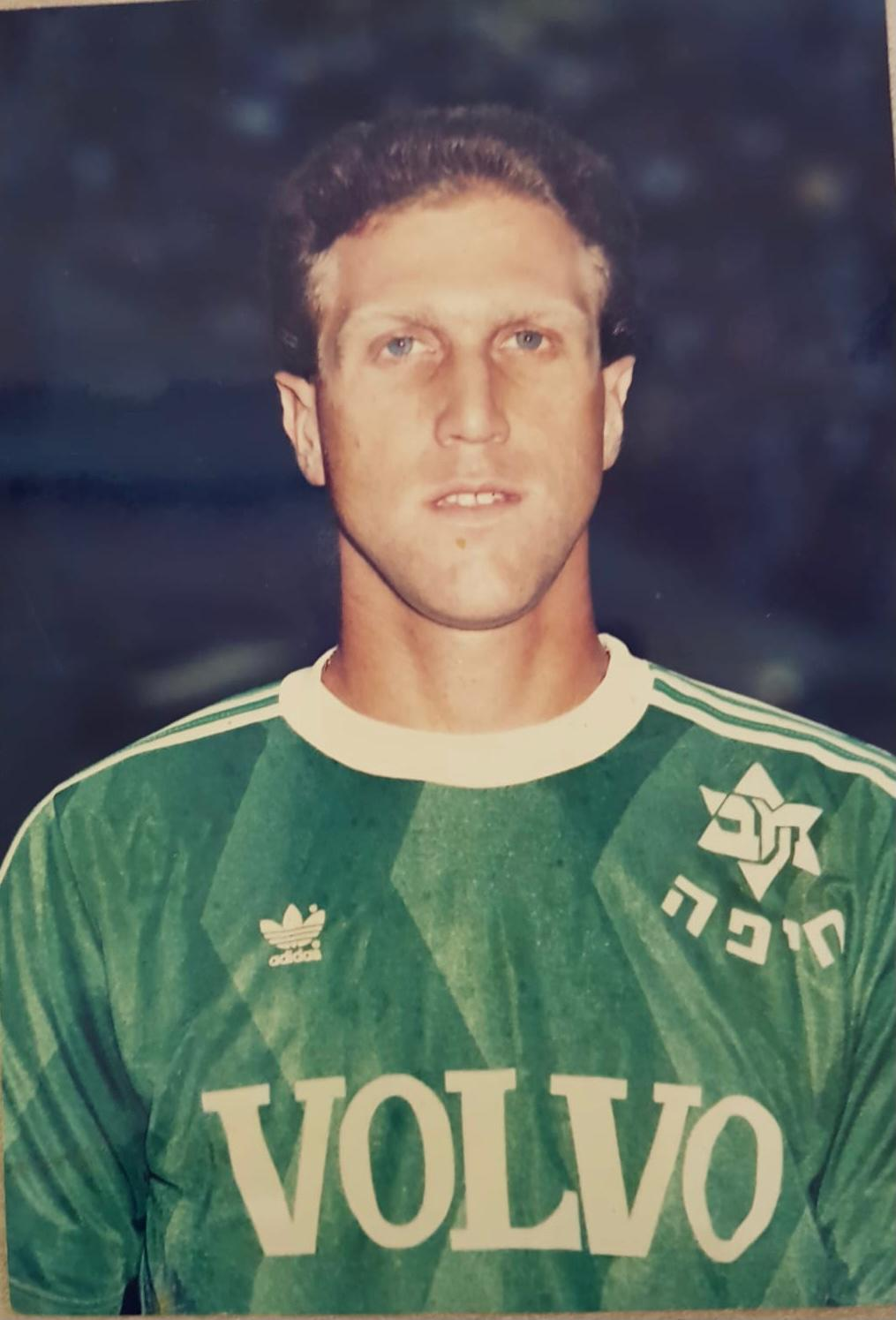

Personal information
- Full name: David Levy
- Date of birth: 26 January 1963 (age 63)
- Place of birth: Haifa, Israel
- Height: 1.85 m (6 ft 1 in)
- Position: Defender

Youth career
- 1972–1982: Maccabi Haifa

Senior career*
Years	Team	Apps	(Gls)
1982–1990	Maccabi Haifa		
1984–1985	→ Hapoel Haifa		
1985–1986	→ Maccabi Yavne		
1986–1987	→ Hapoel Haifa		
1985–1990	Maccabi Haifa		
1990–1991	Hapoel Tirat HaCarmel		
1991–1994	Hapoel Haifa	60	(1)
- * Club domestic league appearances and goals

David Levy (Hebrew: דוד לוי; born 26 January 1963 in Haifa) is an Israeli former professional association footballer who was part of the 1988–89 championship squad at Maccabi Haifa.

== Biography ==
=== Early life ===
Levy joined the Maccabi Haifa youth system at age 9 as he lived very close to Kiryat Eliezer Stadium. Rising through the youth ranks, he was called up to the first team squad by then manager, Jonny Hardy.
