= Fabian Lagman =

Argentine footballer

Fabian Lagman פביאן לגמן
Personal information
- Full name: Fabian Gustavo Lagman
- Place of birth: Argentina
- Position: Midfielder

Senior career*
Years	Team	Apps	(Gls)
- Club Atlético Atlanta
- Club Comunicaciones
- Club Almagro
1988–1989	Maccabi Haifa	8	(0)
- → Hapoel Tirat haCarmel (loan)
- → Maccabi Afula (loan)
- * Club domestic league appearances and goals

Fabian Gustavo Lagman (Hebrew: פביאן גוסטבו לגמן) is an Argentine former professional association football player who was part of the 1988–89 championship squad at Maccabi Haifa. His son, Gaston, is now a professional footballer in Argentina.

== Biography ==
=== Playing career ===
In 1988, Maccabi Haifa decided to bring in Jewish players from Argentina since they would qualify as immigrants and not as transfers. The Jewish Agency paid for all travel and even some living expenses for new immigrants, saving the club money. Lagman was brought in under these circumstances, along with Fabian Grimberg and Patricio Sayegh.
