= Patricio Sayegh =

Argentine footballer

Patricio Sayegh פטריסיו סייג
Personal information
- Full name: Patricio Adrian Sayegh
- Date of birth: 28 December 1967 (age 58)
- Place of birth: Argentina
- Position: Striker

Senior career*
Years	Team	Apps	(Gls)
- San Lorenzo
	Excursionistas	?	(20)
1988–1989	Maccabi Haifa	8	(1)
- → Hapoel Haifa (loan)
- Maccabi Daliyat al-Karmel
- Hapoel Tirat HaCarmel

Managerial career
- 2012–2013: Maccabi Tel Aviv (assistant)
- 2013–2014: Maccabi Haifa (assistant)
- 2014–2015: Maccabi Ironi Kiryat Ata
- 2015–2016: Beitar Tel Aviv Ramla
- 2016: Hapoel Ramat Gan
- 2016–2017: Maccabi Herzliya
- 2017: Hapoel Ramat Gan
- 2018: F.C. Haifa Robi Shapira
- 2018–2019: Maccabi Kiryat Ata
- 2019–2020: Hapoel Bnei Lod (assistant)
- 2020–2021: Hapoel Acre (assistant)
- 2021: Maccabi Tamra
- 2023–: Hapoel Migdal HaEmek
- * Club domestic league appearances and goals

Patricio Sayegh (Hebrew: פטריסיו סייג; born 28 December 1967) is an Argentine former professional association footballer who was part of the 1988–89 championship squad at Maccabi Haifa.

== Biography ==
=== Playing career ===
In 1988, Maccabi Haifa decided to bring in Jewish players from Argentina since they would qualify as immigrants and not as transfers. The Jewish Agency for Israel paid for travel and some living expenses for new immigrants. Sayegh was brought in under these circumstances, along with Fabian Grimberg and Fabian Lagman.
