= Zion Merili =

Israeli footballer

Zion Merili ציון מרילי
Personal information
- Full name: Zion Merili
- Date of birth: 11 February 1957 (age 69)
- Place of birth: Jerusalem, Israel
- Position: Defender

Youth career
- Hapoel Jerusalem

Senior career*
Years	Team	Apps	(Gls)
1974–1983	Hapoel Jerusalem		
1983–1990	Maccabi Haifa	176	(20)

International career
1985–1987	Israel	6	(1)
- * Club domestic league appearances and goals

Zion Merili (Hebrew: ציון מרילי; born 11 February 1957 in Jerusalem) is an Israeli former professional association footballer who was part of the 1988–89 championship squad at Maccabi Haifa and the Israel national football team.

== Biography ==
=== Early life ===
Merili was raised in Katamon within an Orthodox Jewish family. After synagogue services, Zion would sneak away to play football with his friends..
