= Tal Banin =

Israeli footballer and manager

Tal Banin טל בנין
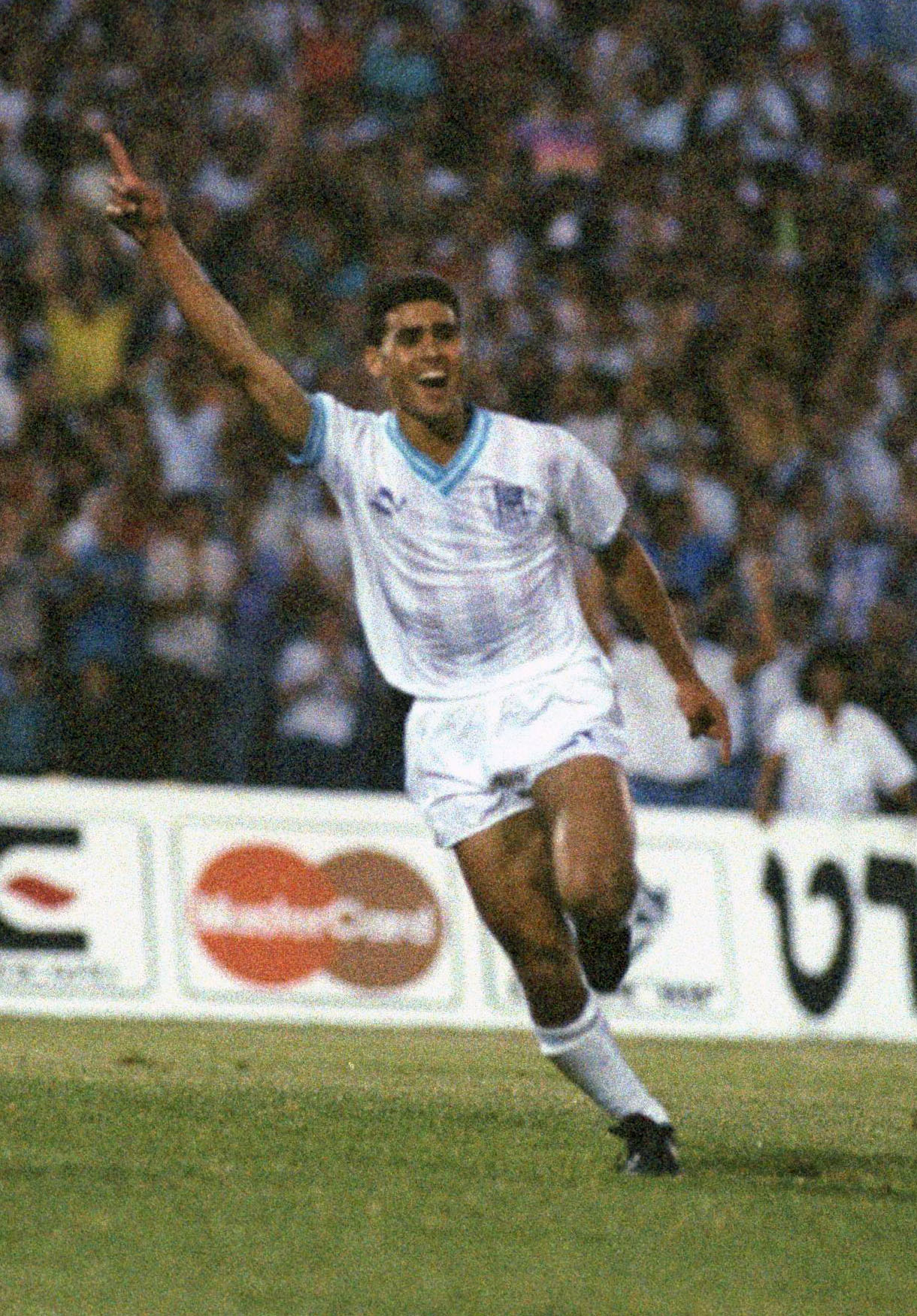
- Banin in 1990

Personal information
- Date of birth: 7 March 1971 (age 55)
- Place of birth: Kiryat Haim, Haifa, Israel
- Height: 1.73 m (5 ft 8 in)
- Position: Defensive midfielder

Team information
- Current team: Maccabi Ahi Nazareth

Youth career
- Hapoel Haifa

Senior career*
Years	Team	Apps	(Gls)
1987–1989	Hapoel Haifa	44	(7)
1989–1992	Maccabi Haifa	94	(17)
1992–1993	Hapoel Haifa	29	(8)
1993–1994	Cannes	23	(2)
1994–1997	Hapoel Haifa	74	(19)
1997–2000	Brescia	81	(3)
2000–2003	Maccabi Tel Aviv	79	(11)
2003–2004	Bnei Yehuda	21	(0)
2004–2005	Beitar Jerusalem	12	(1)
2005–2006	Maccabi Netanya	27	(1)
Total		484	(69)

International career
1986–1987	Israel U-16	4	(1)
1990	Israel U-21		(4)
1990–2003	Israel	77	(12)

Managerial career
- 2008: Maccabi Petah Tikva (assistant manager)
- 2008–2010: Israel U-17
- 2010–2011: Israel (assistant manager)
- 2011–2012: Hapoel Haifa
- 2012–2013: Maccabi Netanya
- 2013–2014: Maccabi Ahi Nazareth
- 2015: Hapoel Haifa
- 2018: Bnei Sakhnin
- 2019: Maccabi Ahi Nazareth
- * Club domestic league appearances and goals

Tal Banin (Hebrew: טל בנין; born 7 March 1971) is an Israeli football manager and former player who most recently was the manager of Maccabi Ahi Nazareth. Banin played as a defensive midfielder. A captain for the Israel national team for many years, Banin was also the only Israeli player to ever play in the Italian Serie A until 2011, when Palermo signed Eran Zahavi.

== Club career ==
Born in Kiryat Haim, Haifa, Israel, Banin joined Hapoel Haifa as a youngster. He trained in their football academy and played for many of Hapoel's youth teams. He made his full debut for the side at 17. Between the years of 1987–89 Banin played a total of 44 games for Hapoel in the second division and scored seven goals.

When Banin was 19 he signed a contract with arch rivals Maccabi Haifa in 1989, they continued his impressive development as a player. He left the club in 1992 after playing 94 games in ligat ha`hal and scoring seventeen goals.

When Banin was just 20 he became the second youngest Israeli to collect the "Player of the Year" accolade in 1991. During the same season he was an integral part in the Maccabi side that won the Israeli League and Cup "double".

Banin then returned to Hapoel Haifa, where he played for a further season playing 29 games and scoring 8 goals in the top division.

In 1993 Banin moved to French side Cannes. He led the side to a sixth position in Ligue 1, the French top division. As a result, Cannes qualified for Europe.

Whilst playing for Cannes, Banin picked up a knee injury. This problem proved to be serious. He began to suffer from a chronic knee problem that would plague him for the rest of his career.

Cannes offered to extend his contract, however after 23 games and two goals Banin declined and returned to Israel to join Hapoel Haifa. He proved to be their star player in what seemed to be a very average side. He remained at Haifa for three years playing a further 74 games for them and scoring 19 goals.

In 1997 Banin was on the move again, this time to Brescia in Italy. He played 26 games for them, scoring one goal. During that year Banin aggravated his knee injury and was unable to prevent Brescia from slipping from Serie A to Serie B. The next year Banin sat out the season through injury but a year later he oversaw Brescia's triumphant return to the top division.

At the insistence of his wife, Banin returned to Israel to sign for Maccabi Tel Aviv. He became vital to the side, and was moulded into the spine of the team. Banin led Maccabi to victory in the State Cup in 2002.

The next season Banin helped Maccabi lift the league title for the first time since 1996.

In the next season's UEFA Champions League, Maccabi were knocked out in the first round. Head Coach Nir Klinger blamed it on the fights between Banin and Maccabi legend Avi Nimni. As a result, on 13 August 2003, they were both kicked out of the side. For a while, Banin was unable to find a team that would accept his high wage demands for the 2003–04 season. He finally moved to play for Bnei Yehuda for the remainder of the season.

In January 2005, Beitar Jerusalem signed the midfielder for the remainder of the 2004–05 season. Beitar were desperate for some steel in the middle after a run of humiliating defeats, aiming to try to avoid relegation.

Banin finished his career in Maccabi Netanya.

== International career ==
During his career Banin was called up to the Israel national team due to his hard work in the midfield. He made his debut on 16 May 1990, against the USSR (or Russia as they are now known). He scored to lead Israel to a 3–2 win at the Ramat Gan Stadium.

He captained the country from 1997 until 2003. Banin is considered one of the best defensive midfielders in the history of Israeli football.

Banin is a highly respected player in Europe, but unfortunately has been unable to fulfill his potential due to his crippling knee injury. Banin played 80 times for Israel scoring 12 goals.

== Managerial career ==
On 8 April 2008, Banin was appointed assistant manager of Nitzan Shirazi in Maccabi Petah Tikva.

After only two months in Petah Tikva, he moved on to coach the Israel national under-17 football team for two years.

On 25 July 2010, Banin was appointed assistant manager of Luis Fernández in the Israel national football team.

In the 2011–12 season he worked as the manager of Hapoel Haifa, helping the club avoid relegation. The day after the season ended he immediately signed a two years contract in Maccabi Netanya replacing Reuven Atar. He was sacked from Maccabi Netanya on 18 March 2013.

In November 2013 he signed a two years contract with Maccabi Ahi Nazareth in the Liga Leumit.

On 16 February 2015, he was appointed manager of Hapoel Haifa, once more, in order to help the club in the battle against relegation.

== Managerial statistics ==
Team	Nat	From	To	Record				
Team	Nat	From	To	G	W	D	L	Win %
Israel U-17	(Israel)	July 2008	July 2010	28	11	2	15	39.29
Hapoel Haifa	(Israel)	28 November 2011	12 May 2012	24	10	7	7	41.67
Maccabi Netanya	(Israel)	13 May 2012	18 March 2013	36	9	12	15	25.00
Maccabi Ahi Nazareth	(Israel)	25 November 2013	14 June 2014	26	10	9	7	38.46
Hapoel Haifa	(Israel)	16 February 2015	21 December 2015	29	8	7	14	27.59
Total				143	48	37	58	33.57

== Honours ==
- Israeli Premier League: 1988–89, 1990–91, 2002–03
- Israel State Cup: 1991, 2001, 2002; runner-up 1995

== See also ==
- List of select Jewish football (association; soccer) players
