= Fabian Grimberg =

Argentine footballer

Fabian Grimberg פביאן גרימברג
Personal information
- Full name: Osvaldo Fabian Grimberg
- Date of birth: 19 November 1964 (age 61)
- Place of birth: Buenos Aires, Argentina
- Height: 1.80 m (5 ft 11 in)
- Position: Defender

Senior career*
| Years | Team | Apps | (Gls) |
| 1980–1986 | Vélez Sársfield | | |
| 1986–1988 | Atlético Aldosivi | | |
| 1988–1990 | Maccabi Haifa | 30 | (0) |
| 1990–1991 | Shimshon Tel Aviv | - | (-) |
| 1991–1992 | Maccabi Ironi Ashdod | - | (-) |
| 1992–1993 | Club Almagro | | |
| 1993–1995 | Hapoel Tirat HaCarmel | | |
| 1995–1997 | Maccabi Kafr Kanna | | |
- * Club domestic league appearances and goals

Osvaldo Fabian Grimberg (Hebrew: אוסבלדו פביאן גרימברג; born 6 February 1962) is an Argentine former professional association footballer who was part of the 1988–89 championship squad at Maccabi Haifa.

== Biography ==
=== Playing career ===
In 1988, Maccabi Haifa decided to bring in Jewish players from Argentina since they would qualify as immigrants and not as transfers. The Jewish Agency paid for all travel and even some living expenses for new immigrants, saving the club money. Grimberg was brought in under these circumstances, along with Fabian Lagman and Patricio Sayegh.
