= Najwan Ghrayib =

Israeli footballer (born 1974)

Najwan Ghrayib نجوان غريب
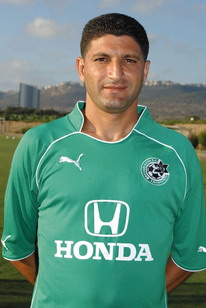
- Ghrayib in 2005

Personal information
- Date of birth: January 30, 1974 (age 52)
- Place of birth: Nazareth, Israel
- Height: 1.78 m (5 ft 10 in)
- Position: Defender

Youth career
- 1990–1994: Maccabi Ahi Nazareth

Senior career*
Years	Team	Apps	(Gls)
1994–1995	Maccabi Haifa	23	(4)
1995–1997	Hapoel Petah Tikva	49	(14)
1997–1999	Hapoel Haifa	55	(9)
1999–2001	Aston Villa	5	(0)
2001–2002	Hapoel Haifa	40	(1)
2002–2003	Maccabi Ahi Nazareth	29	(2)
2003–2004	Hapoel Petah Tikva	18	(2)
2004–2005	Maccabi Haifa	7	(0)
2005–2006	Maccabi Ahi Nazareth	34	(1)

International career
1998–2001	Israel	18	(4)

Managerial career
- 2008–2009: Maccabi Ahi Nazareth (Assistant Manager)
- 2010: Hapoel Bnei Lod
- 2018–2020: Maccabi Ahi Nazareth
- * Club domestic league appearances and goals

Najwan Ghrayib (Arabic: نجوان غريب, Hebrew: נג'ואן גרייב; born January 30, 1974) is an Israeli former footballer and former manager of his hometown club Maccabi Ahi Nazareth. Between 2009 and 2010, he was the assistant manager at Maccabi Ahi Nazareth to John Gregory, his former boss at Aston Villa.

== Club career ==
=== Israel ===
Ghrayib came up through the youth ranks at Maccabi Ahi Nazareth, and finally got his debut in 1992 at the age of 18 playing for them in the Liga Alef, the third tier of Israeli football. His consistently strong performances won him a move to Israeli Premier League side Maccabi Haifa in 1994, where he won the championship with them in his first season there. A short stint at Maccabi Petah Tikva in 1995 followed, after which he made another move to Hapoel Haifa in 1997.

=== England ===
After a successful season at Hapoel Haifa, Ghrayib received interest from English club Tottenham Hotspur. He was set to join the team for the 1999–2000 FA Premier League season, and even appeared on the PlayStation video game FA Premier League Stars as a Tottenham player, however his proposed transfer eventually fell through. That is when Aston Villa decided to make an offer after club scout Ross MacLaren declared him to be the best left back he had ever seen. Aston Villa paid £1 million for his transfer but Ghrayib saw very little first-team action and was sold back to Hapoel Haifa for just £150,000 in February 2001.

=== Return to Israel ===
His return to Hapoel Haifa saw him spend another two years at the club before moving back to his boyhood club Maccabi Ahi Nazareth for one season, winning promotion back to the Israeli Premier League with them before moving again to Hapoel Petah Tikva. The 2004–05 season saw him return to Maccabi Haifa before finishing out his career with Maccabi Ahi Nazareth, retiring at the end of the 2005–06 season.

== International career ==
Ghrayib made 18 appearances for the Israel national team. He started and scored the final goal in Israel's 5–0 victory over Austria in the qualification rounds for the UEFA Euro 2000 tournament. The Israeli team finished second behind Spain in its qualifying group with 13 points, guaranteeing them a play-off against Denmark for a spot in the final tournament, which they had never reached before. Ghrayib did not play or make the 18-man squad for either of the two legs of the fixture as they lost by an aggregate score of 8–0.

=== Arab-Israeli identity ===
Ghrayib has generated controversy by speaking out publicly about the treatment afforded Arabs in Israel and his Palestinian heritage, an issue not normally discussed in Israeli media given the contentious nature of the subject matter. In one widely publicized interview with a local Haifa newspaper ('Kolbo' or 'Department' in English), he referred to then-Israeli Prime Minister Ariel Sharon as a 'dog', 'coming from a party that hates Arabs', and compared him to former Iraqi dictator Saddam Hussein. The response of the Israeli public to this interview was indicative of what Shor, Eran, and Yonay (2011) describe as a "shut up and play" mentality; many of the responses to this interview were either that Ghrayib should not be commenting on politics as he was simply an athlete, or that he was simply an Arab, and "...all Arabs hate us [Israelis]...so deport him to Palestine!" Soon after, Ghrayib issued subsequent statements explaining that he was "just joking" and apologizing for anyone he had offended, despite some asserting that his views reflected those of the moderate Arab population in Israel.

== Honours ==
- Israeli Premier League: 1998–99, 2004–05
- State Cup: 1994–95
- Toto Cup: 2000–01
