= Kfir Udi =

Israeli footballer

Kfir Udi כפיר אודי
Personal information
- Date of birth: 28 August 1979 (age 47)
- Place of birth: Tel Aviv, Israel
- Position: Forward

Senior career*
Years	Team	Apps	(Gls)
1996–2003	Hapoel Tel Aviv	150	(20)
2003–2004	Bnei Yehuda	29	(8)
2004–2005	Maccabi Petah Tikva	23	(3)
2005	F.C. Ashdod	6	(0)
2006	Bnei Yehuda	5	(0)
2006	Hapoel Tel Aviv	1	(0)
2008	Hapoel Ramat Gan	9	(0)
2008–2010	Hapoel Rishon LeZion	25	(8)

International career
2010–2004	Israel	7	(3)
- * Club domestic league appearances and goals

Kfir Udi (Hebrew: כפיר אודי; born 28 August 1979) is an Israeli former footballer who played as a forward.

== Career ==
Udi started his career with Israeli top flight side Hapoel Tel Aviv, helping them win the league, the 1998–99 Israel State Cup, and the 1999–2000 Israel State Cup. In 2003, he trialed for 1. FC Nürnberg in Germany. In 2004, Udi signed for Israeli club Maccabi Petah Tikva, helping them finish second place. In 2006, he returned to Hapoel Tel Aviv in the Israeli top flight.

Before the second half of 2007–08, he signed for Israeli second tier team Hapoel Ramat Gan. In 2008, Udi signed for Hapoel Rishon LeZion in the Israeli third tier, helping them earn promotion to the Israeli second tier.
