= Avi Nimni =

Israeli footballer

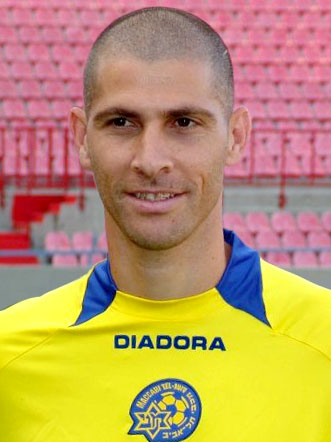
- Nimni with Maccabi Tel Aviv in 2007

Personal information
- Full name: Aviyahu Nimni
- Date of birth: 26 April 1972 (age 54)
- Place of birth: Holon, Israel
- Height: 1.88 m (6 ft 2 in)
- Positions: Midfielder; second striker

Youth career
- 1980–1990: Maccabi Tel Aviv

Senior career*
Years	Team	Apps	(Gls)
1990–1997	Maccabi Tel Aviv	207	(75)
1997–1998	Atlético Madrid	7	(0)
1998–2003	Maccabi Tel Aviv	116	(77)
1999–2000	→ Derby County (loan)	4	(1)
2003–2005	Beitar Jerusalem	50	(20)
2005–2008	Maccabi Tel Aviv	32	(22)
Total		416	(195)

International career
1990–1993	Israel U21	4	(2)
1992–2006	Israel	80	(17)

Managerial career
- 2008–2011: Maccabi Tel Aviv (general manager)
- * Club domestic league appearances and goals

Avi Nimni (Hebrew: אבי נמני; born 26 April 1972) is an Israeli former professional footballer and Maccabi Tel Aviv's highest ever scorer. He is regarded as one of Maccabi Tel Aviv's greatest players ever. Until 2006, he served as the captain of the Israel national team. His number 8 shirt has become so symbolic (despite him wearing the number sixteen as a youth, because Uri Malmilian wore the number 8) that Maccabi Tel Aviv has retired the number at the end of his active football career.

== Career ==
=== Early years ===
Nimni was approximately seven years old when he joined Maccabi Tel Aviv's training facility in Kiryat Shalom. Nimni played for every Maccabi youth team and also featured for the Israeli national youth sides.

At 17 he played his first game in the Liga Leumit and was a regular for Maccabi's first team at 18. Whilst at Maccabi Nimni experienced much success becoming one of their most important players during this period.

In 1998, he inherited the Maccabi captaincy when the previous long-serving captain Nir Klinger retired due to injury. Klinger went on to become assistant coach at Maccabi.

=== Going abroad ===
Between 1996 and 2001, Maccabi suffered dark times on the field winning only the Toto Cup in 1999. This was due partly to the absence of Nimni who was transferred in 1997 to Atlético Madrid. However, Nimni's time at the club was blighted by injury, and he returned to Maccabi after just seven appearances.

A year later Nimni was loaned out to Derby County. Although Nimni helped set up a goal on his debut against Arsenal and also scored away to Everton, in what subsequently proved to be a handful of appearances, Derby decided not to purchase Nimni outright. They instead signed fellow loanee Giorgi Kinkladze to ensure they had no more than three non-EU first-team players, and Nimni returned to Maccabi.

=== 2000–2001 ===
In 2000, the former Israel national coach, Shlomo Sharf, became Maccabi's coach. Sharf, well known for his temper, commented after the second game of the season in Maccabi's 2–2 draw with Hapoel Haifa saying "did you even see Nimni? I'm sure he didn't play! If it wasn't for the fans I would have substituted him at half-time". The next day Nimni spoke to Channel Five, replying "there is a normal way of saying things, not in a humiliating barbaric way". Sharf wanted to sell Nimni, however the chairman Lonny Herzikowicz declined the request, and Sharf then resigned from his post.

=== Nir Klinger ===
At the beginning of the 2002 season, Nir Klinger was appointed Head Coach of Maccabi. As a former Maccabi player he was well respected by the fans. He was nicknamed "The Soul" for playing in any situation despite being injured on many occasions.

Following Maccabi's 3–0 loss at home to Hapoel Be'er Sheva they went to play title holders Maccabi Haifa in the 14th fixture of the season. Klinger shocked the nation by naming Nimni on the bench, and replaced him with Baruch Dego. After an incredible game Maccabi emerged as 3–2 victors. Nimni remained on the bench for the remainder of the season only to watch Dego pick up the player of the season accolade.

After the 28th fixture, Nimni gave an interview to a radio show claiming, "players told me that, if I played we would have had 15 points more". On hearing this Klinger sent him to the stands dropping him from the squad. During the 30th game of the season Dego broke his ankle with the fixture against Beitar Jerusalem looming. At the time Maccabi were in first place. They had exactly the same points as Maccabi Haifa and Hapoel Tel Aviv but had a better goal difference of the three teams. Beitar took the lead after 32 minutes and doubled their score just a minute later. Beitar went into the half-time break 2–1 up after an own goal a minute before. Maccabi were watching the Championship slip from their grasp. However Nimni had other ideas and scored two goals leading Maccabi to a 3–2 win.

In the 32nd game, Maccabi played Bnei Yehuda and Nimni scored a hat-trick and Maccabi won 5–0. After the match in an interview a reporter asked Klinger about Nimni, Klinger replied "do you want it in a phrase or a song; Avi Nimni is the king". In the final game of the season Maccabi faced Hapoel Petah Tikva. 40,000 spectators saw Nimni score leading Maccabi to a 3–0 win. Consequently, they lifted the Championship. Despite being dropped earlier in the season Nimni finished the season as Maccabi's top goalscorer with 14 goals.

However, not everything was rosy for Nimni. It was reported that he and teammate Tal Banin (ex-Brescia) had a bust-up. The team was divided between "Avi Nimni supporters" and "Tal Banin supporters". Nimni, Banin and Klinger all denied the reports that any altercation had occurred.

On 13 August 2003, Klinger called a press conference to be covered by all the media. He issued a statement along the lines that "the dispute between Nimni and Banin is destroying every good part in Maccabi, dividing the team, and causing nothing but anger between the players". He forced both Nimni and Banin out of the club.

The fans were outraged and for two years they came in black shirts as a sign of grief and holding signs saying: "8 is in our blood, Avi Nimni will always be in Maccabi". The fans were not satisfied despite winning the Cup and taking second place in the league resulting in the qualification to the UEFA Champions League for the first time ever.

After being kicked out of Maccabi, Nimni joined Beitar Jerusalem. He played at the Teddy Stadium for two years scoring 20 goals.

After two years of exile Nimni was brought back to Maccabi in 2005 by Nir Klinger, who resigned later that year.

=== Retirement ===
Nimni is considered as Maccabi's talisman and the fan's favourite. He started his comeback season on the right foot, by scoring the winning goal in the opening match of the 2005–06 season. After a bad year when Maccabi only won the State Cup, Nimni moved forward to another year with the yellow side.

The 2006–07 season was a pretty good year to Avi surely better than the previous. Avi scored in that season 10 goals with his actually last year as a player. Nimni said that he want to retire in the end of the season but a loss to the fierce rivals in the local derby Hapoel Tel Aviv made him consider his retirement and he decided to stay for another year.

Nimni's last year started with a loss the Andorra Santa Coloma. On 25 August 2007, Nimni scored his last goal for the Israeli Premier league on the second fixture versus Maccabi Petah Tikva and became the third all-time scorer. After that Avi was injured in the Toto Cup that put him out for the rest of the year.

On 17 May 2008, Nimni played his last match when he entered on the 90-minute to the crowd's roar; some of the people even cried. After Nimni retired, Maccabi Tel Aviv decided to retire his shirt, too.

Nimni is Maccabi's all-time top goalscorer, having scored 174 goals. He has scored 194 goals overall in the league, and he is now the number three all-time top goal scorer in Israeli football.

== Career statistics ==
Scores and results list Israel's goal tally first, score column indicates score after each Nimni goal.

List of international goals scored by Avi Nimni
No.	Date	Venue	Opponent	Score	Result	Competition
1	6 August 1997	Dinamo Stadium, Minsk, Belarus	Belarus	2–0	3–2	Friendly
2	17 May 1998	Daugava Stadium, Riga, Latvia	Latvia	1–0	5–1	Friendly
3	5 September 1998	Ernst-Happel-Stadion, Vienna, Austria	Austria	1–1	1–1	UEFA Euro 2000 qualification
4	10 October 1998	San Marino Stadium, Serravalle, San Marino	San Marino	2–0	5–0	UEFA Euro 2000 qualifying
5	18 January 1999	Ramat Gan Stadium, Ramat Gan, Israel	Estonia	1–0	7–0	1999 Tri Nations Tournament
6	9 February 1999	Kiryat Eliezer Stadium, Haifa, Israel	Belarus	1–0	2–1	Friendly
7	9 February 1999	Kiryat Eliezer Stadium, Haifa, Israel	Belarus	2–1	2–1	Friendly
8	23 February 2000	Kiryat Eliezer Stadium, Haifa, Israel	Russia	4–1	4–1	Friendly
9	2 June 2001	Rheinpark Stadion, Vaduz, Liechtenstein	Liechtenstein	3–0	3–0	2002 FIFA World Cup qualification
10	15 August 2001	Darius and Girėnas Stadium, Kaunas, Lithuania	Lithuania	3–2	3–2	Friendly
11	17 April 2002	Parken Stadium, Copenhagen, Denmark	Denmark	1–3	1–3	Friendly
12	20 November 2002	Philip II Arena, Skopje, Macedonia	North Macedonia	2–0	3–2	Friendly
13	12 February 2003	Ramat Gan Stadium, Ramat Gan, Israel	Armenia	1–0	2–0	Friendly
14	20 August 2003	Luzhniki Stadium, Moscow, Russia	Russia	1–0	2–1	Friendly
15	17 November 2004	GSP Stadium, Nicosia, Cyprus	Cyprus	2–1	2–1	2006 FIFA World Cup qualification
16	4 June 2005	Lansdowne Road, Dublin, Republic of Ireland	Republic of Ireland	2–2	2–2	2006 FIFA World Cup qualification
17	7 September 2005	Tórsvøllur, Tórshavn, Faroe Islands	Faroe Islands	1–0	2–0	2006 FIFA World Cup qualification

== Honours ==
=== As player ===
Maccabi Tel Aviv

- Israeli Premier League: 1991–92, 1994–95, 1995–96, 2002–03
- State Cup: 1993–94, 1995–96, 2000–01, 2001–02
- Toto Cup: 1992–93, 1998–99

=== Individual ===
- Israeli Premier League top scorer – 2000–01

=== As manager ===
Maccabi Tel Aviv

- Toto Cup: 2008–09

== Records ==
- Most goals in an Israeli Premier League: 3rd – 194 goals
- Most goals in Maccabi Tel Aviv: 174 goals

Sporting positions
Preceded by Gadi Brumer	Maccabi Tel Aviv F.C. captain 2005–2008	Succeeded by Sheran Yeini
