= Offer Mizrahi =

Israeli footballer

Offer Mizrahi עופר מזרחי
Personal information
- Date of birth: 3 March 1967 (age 59)
- Place of birth: Haifa, Israel
- Height: 1.85 m (6 ft 1 in)
- Position: Striker

Youth career
- 1973–1986: Maccabi Haifa

Senior career*
Years	Team	Apps	(Gls)
1986–1992	Maccabi Haifa	104	(27)
1992	Maccabi Herzliya	13	(2)
1992–1993	Maccabi Haifa	32	(10)
1993–1994	Tzafririm Holon	29	(8)
1994–1996	Maccabi Herzliya	54	(20)
1996–1997	Maccabi Tel Aviv	25	(6)
1997–1998	Hapoel Ashkelon	3	(0)
Total		260	(73)

International career
1990	Israel U18	1	(0)
1990–1996	Israel	13	(1)
- * Club domestic league appearances and goals

Offer Mizrahi (Hebrew: עופר מזרחי; born 3 March 1967 in Haifa) is an Israeli former professional association footballer who was part of the 1988–89 championship squad at Maccabi Haifa and the Israel national football team.

== Biography ==
=== Early life ===
Mizrahi joined the Maccabi Haifa academy at age 6 as he grew up in Kiryat Eliezer.
