= Shimon Gershon =

Israeli footballer

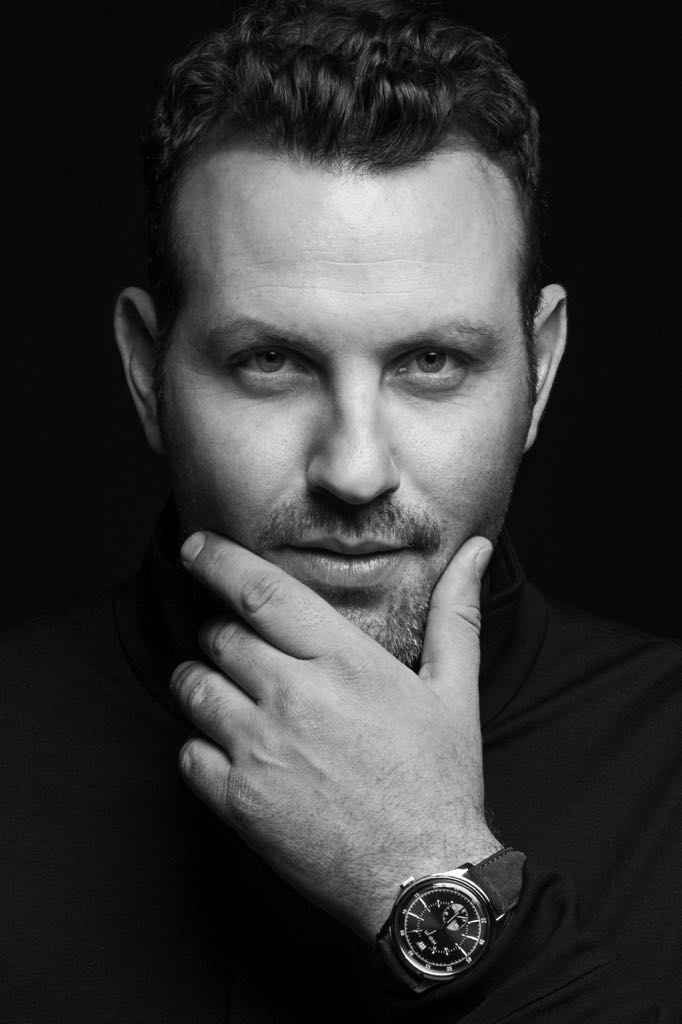

Personal information
- Date of birth: October 6, 1977 (age 49)
- Place of birth: Tel Aviv, Israel
- Position: Defender

Youth career
- 1989–1996: Hapoel Tel Aviv

Senior career*
| Years | Team | Apps | (Gls) |
| 1995–2006 | Hapoel Tel Aviv | 228 | (8) |
| 2006–2010 | Beitar Jerusalem | 111 | (3) |

International career^{‡}
| 1997–1999 | Israel U-21 | 15 | (0) |
| 1999–2008 | Israel | 50 | (4) |
- * Club domestic league appearances and goals as of 16 May 2010 ‡ National team caps and goals as of 1 December 2006

Shimon Gershon (Hebrew: שמעון גרשון; born October 6, 1977) is a retired Israeli national footballer and central defender. For nearly 10 years, Gershon was the captain of the Israeli football team Hapoel Tel Aviv. In 2006, he moved to capital city club Beitar Jerusalem, newly bought by Russian benefactor Arkady Gaydamak.

This transfer was not well received among Hapoel supporters, and some had resorted to verbal abuse regarding Gershon, accusing him of infidelity towards his boyhood club. In response, Gershon organized a press conference to address the issue, in which he expressed his love for, and regret at leaving his home club, also adding that it was his right to seek improvement in his salary, and take care of his proper interests.

Although Hapoel supporters have often expressed and still do express a certain degree of offence and disappointment regarding Gershon's new club of choice, the verbal abuse has nearly died out, and none have resorted to violent behaviour towards the player.

Gershon started playing football from a young age at Hapoel Tel Aviv's youth team. He played his first game for the first team in the 1995–1996 season against Bnei Yehuda. Throughout the years he was at Hapoel, Gershon achieved a lot with the team including winning the State Cup, the league and cup double, and the Toto Cup. He was also part of the team that reached the UEFA Cup quarter finals beating teams of the likes of Chelsea and Parma on the way, Gershon was integral to much of Hapoel's successes, taking a part in many of the team's victories. He scored one of the goals as they memorably knocked out Chelsea. Unfortunately, Gershon's own goal in the return leg of the quarterfinal matchup against A.C. Milan brought Milan the 2–1 aggregate victory.

Gershon also plays for Israel's National Football Team where he has made 50 appearances and scored 4 goals. In some of those games he captained the side.

Although Gershon is a high-level footballer he began a musical career beginning with the publishing of his first album with his model wife Mali Levi and his brother Sabi Gershon. While focusing on his musical career, Gershon received much criticism from his fans who claimed that he is not putting enough effort into his football career but that didn't stop him from leading his teams to championships and trophies. Towards the end of his sport career, Shimon wrote adventures books that immediately became bestsellers for kids all over Israel and he received awards for gold sales. Today, Shimon is the owner of a content and production company through which he writes screenplays and promotes their production.

== Honours ==
- Israeli Premier League: 1999–00, 2006–07, 2007–08
- Israel State Cup: 1999, 2000, 2006, 2008, 2009
- Toto Cup: 2001–02, 2009–10
