= Pini Balili =

Israeli-Turkish footballer and manager

Pini Balili פִּינִי בַּלִילִי
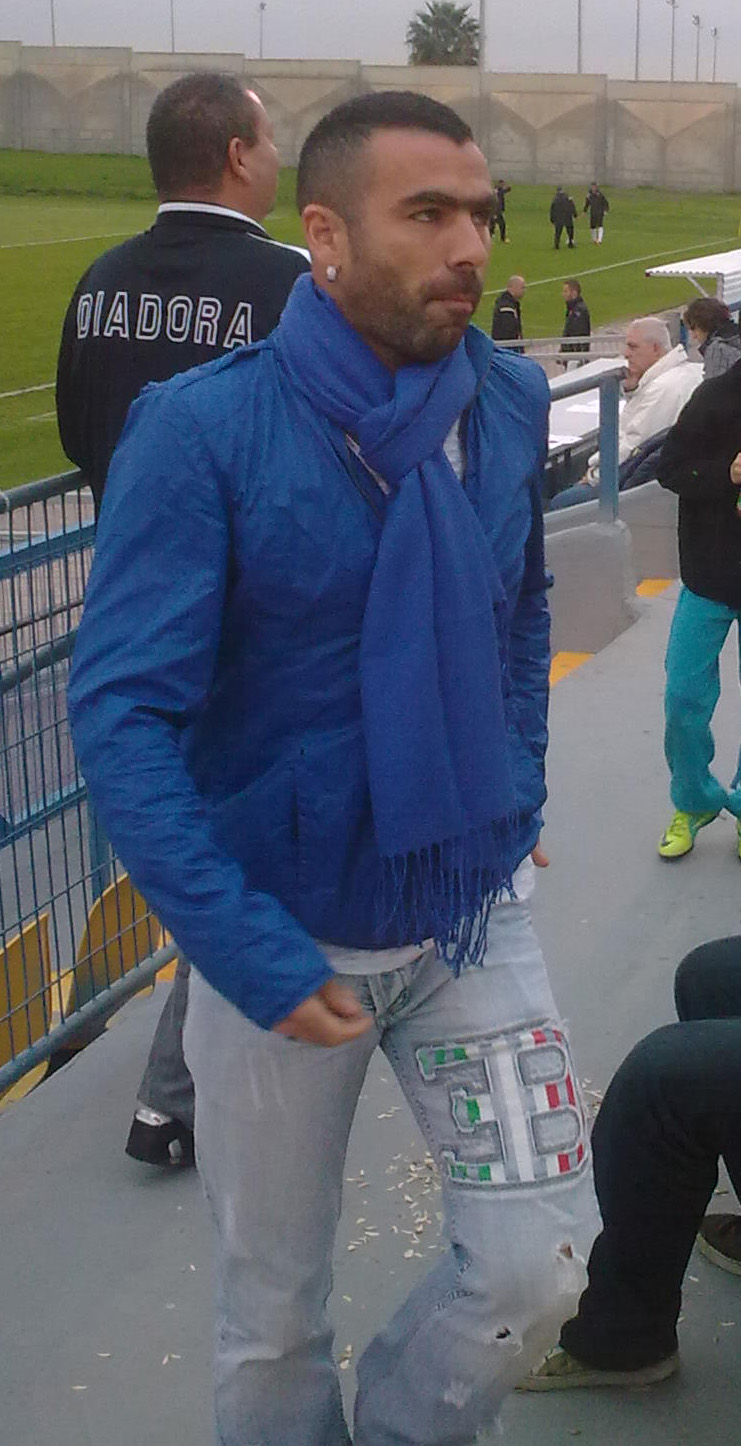

Personal information
- Full name: Pinhas Felix Balili פִּנחַס פֱלִיקס בַּלִילִי
- Date of birth: 18 June 1979 (age 47)
- Place of birth: Bat Yam, Israel
- Height: 1.72 m (5 ft 7 1/2 in)
- Position: Forward

Youth career
- 1990–1996: Hapoel Tel Aviv

Senior career*
Years	Team	Apps	(Gls)
1996–1997	Shimshon Tel Aviv	9	(1)
1997–2003	Hapoel Tel Aviv	115	(35)
2003–2004	İstanbulspor	29	(13)
2004–2005	Kayserispor	28	(10)
2005–2009	Sivasspor	95	(21)
2009–2010	Antalyaspor	15	(0)
2010–2012	Bnei Yehuda	62	(7)
2012–2014	Maccabi Ironi Bat Yam	34	(12)

International career
1997	Israel U18	3	(0)
2000	Israel U21	4	(1)
2000–2007	Israel	29	(7)

Managerial career
- 2012–2013: Maccabi Ironi Bat Yam (caretaker player-manager)
- 2013–2014: Maccabi Ironi Bat Yam (assistant manager)
- 2014–2015: Maccabi Holon (women)
- 2015: F.C. Shikun HaMizrah (general manager)
- 2015–2016: Agudat Sport Ashdod
- * Club domestic league appearances and goals

Pini Balili (Hebrew: פִּינִי בַּלִילִי; born 18 June 1979) is an Israeli former football manager and former player. He was born in Jerusalem and is Jewish, of Turkish descent.

== Career ==
=== Move back to Hapoel ===
As a youngster, Balili grew up supporting Hapoel Tel Aviv and was part of the youth system there before moving to Shimshon Tel Aviv in his teens. It wasn't long before he caught the eye of Hapoel scouts who saw Balili as a missed opportunity so the club purchased his contract after just one professional season. His breakout did not come until the Dror Kashtan era at Hapoel Tel Aviv. Instrumental in the club's success in the UEFA Cup, Balili found himself featuring for the national team as well. After the 2002–03 season, Hapoel decided to cut wages and Pini left for Turkish club Istanbulspor.

=== Time in Turkey ===
Balili's Turkish league debut was sensational; on 10 August 2003, he scored a beautiful chip as his team surprised city rivals Fenerbache 3–0. troubles at Istanbulspor led to Balili being let go after just one season. Though he immediately signed with newly promoted Kayserispor. In 2006, Sivasspor applied for Turkish citizenship for Balili stating that he is a model citizen in Turkey and has full grasp of the Turkish language.

A somewhat religious man, rumors were started that a league match between Sivasspor and Ankaraspor, was postponed during the 2006–07 on account of it coinciding with Yom Kippur. The Turkish Football Federation denied these claims. The story garnered some press coverage, namely because Israeli goalkeeper, Dudu Aouate claimed that he was willing to play on the Jewish day of atonement.

On 12 August 2007, Balili was viciously tackled by Trabzonspor's Egyptian defensive midfielder, Ayman Abdelaziz. Allegedly, Ayman swore at Balili in Arabic before the tackle and it caused the Sivasspor players to fight with the Trabzonspor players. A spectator then jumped onto the pitch and threw punches. Sivasspor players responded which led to a big fight on the field. Trabzonspor got punished for this incident.

=== Return to Israel ===
On 16 June 2010, Balili signed a two-year contract with Bnei Yehuda reuniting with his former coach Dror Kashtan.

On 17 October 2012, he moved to play for Maccabi Ironi Bat Yam in Liga Alef, there he played for two seasons until he retired from playing at the end of the 2013–14 season.

== Managerial career ==
On 10 December 2012, Balili took over as the caretaker manager of Maccabi Ironi Bat Yam while still playing for them. The next season Balili worked as the assistant manager of Bat Yam until the club folded at the end of the 2013–14 season.

In the 2014–15 season, Balili worked as the manager of Maccabi Holon in the Ligat Nashim.

On 30 July 2015, Balili was appointed as the general manager of F.C. Shikun HaMizrah.

== Honours ==
- Israeli Premier League: 1999–00
- Israel State Cup (2): 1999, 2000
- Toto Cup (1): 2001–02
- Süper Lig runner-up: 2008–09

== See also ==
- List of select Jewish football (association; soccer) players
