= Reuven Atar =

Israeli footballer (born 1969)

Reuven Atar ראובן עטר
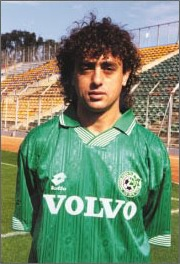
- Atar with Maccabi Haifa

Personal information
- Date of birth: 3 January 1969 (age 57)
- Place of birth: Tirat Carmel, Israel
- Position: Midfielder

Youth career
- 1977–1986: Maccabi Haifa

Senior career*
Years	Team	Apps	(Gls)
1986–1994	Maccabi Haifa	198	(49)
1994–1997	Hapoel Haifa	69	(37)
1997	Beitar Jerusalem	1	(0)
1998–1999	Hapoel Petah Tikva	27	(5)
1999	Hapoel Haifa	5	(2)
2000	Beitar Jerusalem	16	(5)
2000–2002	Maccabi Haifa	66	(6)
2002–2003	Maccabi Netanya	21	(9)

International career
1989–1997	Israel	33	(3)

Managerial career
- 2003–2004: Maccabi Netanya (assistant)
- 2004–2006: Maccabi Netanya
- 2006: Maccabi Herzliya
- 2007–2008: Maccabi Netanya
- 2008–2009: Beitar Jerusalem
- 2009–2012: Maccabi Netanya
- 2012: Maccabi Haifa
- 2013: Maccabi Netanya
- 2014–2015: Hapoel Haifa
- 2015–2016: Maccabi Netanya
- 2017: Hapoel Afula
- 2017: Ashdod
- 2019–2020: Beitar Nes Tubruk (youth)
- 2020: Hapoel Bnei Lod
- * Club domestic league appearances and goals

Reuven Atar (Hebrew: ראובן עטר; born 3 January 1969) is an Israeli football manager and former player. As a player, he played as a midfielder, most notably with Maccabi Haifa. As a manager, he's mostly known for having five spells with Maccabi Netanya.

== Early life ==
Atar was born in Tirat Carmel, Israel, to Sephardic Jewish immigrant parents from Iraq. During his adolescence, he played football for the Maccabi Haifa youth club. For many, he is one of the greatest players to ever wear the Haifa colors.

== Playing career ==
After playing eight seasons for Maccabi Haifa and winning three titles for the club (the Toto Cup, and the Israel State Cup twice – one of which as both a Cup and a championship title at the same year), he joined the local rival team – Hapoel Haifa for four seasons, before being signed off to Beitar Jerusalem. At Beitar he played only one match before being injured, which rendered him unable to play during the rest of the season.

In the next season, Atar moved to Hapoel Petah Tikva for a single season, before moving back to Hapoel Haifa and a few months later back to Beitar Jerusalem, where he became one of the most popular players. In 2000, he returned to Maccabi Haifa, winning two championships. Atar left Haifa for Maccabi Netanya before the 2002–03 season, the last team in his professional career as a player.

== Coaching career ==
During the season at Maccabi Netanya, Atar was injured and decided to retire from his career as a player. He quickly signed as assistant coach at Maccabi Netanya, first alongside Gili Landau and later on Eli Cohen. At the end of the 2003–04 season, Cohen left the club, and Atar was chosen as the club's head-coach. Even though Netanya was relegated at the end of that season to the second league in Israel, Liga Leumit, Atar remained in his position and helped the club return to the Premier League after one season. In 2006, Atar was sent home by Netanya's new manager, Eyal Berkovich, and proceeded to move and coach Maccabi Herzliya, from which he was fired after eight league games before returning to Netanya, later guiding the club to the second place in the Israeli Premier League, and the UEFA Cup Qualifying rounds.

Atar was later dismissed from Netanya, after team's owner Daniel Jammer signed Lothar Matthäus.

In September 2008, he signed for Beitar Jerusalem replacing Itzhak Shum. Later that year he won the Israeli Cup, but was dismissed and replaced by Shum.

On 29 September 2009, Atar returned once again to Maccabi Netanya, making it his third stint as the manager of the club. On 7 May 2011, he broke Netanya's undefeated streak from 1971 as he managed the team for 16 straight games without losing a match.

On 23 April 2012, he signed a two-year contract for his home club of Maccabi Haifa. In 13 November he was sacked from Haifa.

On 19 March 2013, he returned to Maccabi Netanya for his fourth stint as the manager of the club.

In the start of the 2014–15 season he worked as the manager of Hapoel Haifa. He was fired after four months on the job.

On 6 November 2015, Atar returned to Maccabi Netanya for his fifth stint as the manager of the club.

== Career statistics ==
=== Club ===
Appearances and goals by club, season and competition:
Club	Season	League		Israel State Cup		Toto Cup		Europe		Total	
Club	Season	Apps	Goals	Apps	Goals	Apps	Goals	Apps	Goals	Apps	Goals
Maccabi Haifa	1986–87	4	1	1	0	1	0				
Maccabi Haifa	1987–88	16	2	2	1	6	2				
Maccabi Haifa	1988–89	27	8	9	4	1	0				
Maccabi Haifa	1989–90	23	2	2	2	6	1				
Maccabi Haifa	1990–91	30	15	5	1	6	4	3	4		
Maccabi Haifa	1991–92	28	13	6	0	4	0				
Maccabi Haifa	1992–93	31	10	5	1	4	1				
Maccabi Haifa	1993–94	37	8	1	0	5	2	5	1		
Hapoel Haifa	1994–95	19	5	3	2	2	2				
Hapoel Haifa	1995–96	27	21	2	1	2	1				
Hapoel Haifa	1996–97	6	1								
Maccabi Haifa	1996–97	18	6	3	1	2					
Hapoel Haifa	1997–98	11	5								
Beitar Jerusalem	1997–98	1	0								
Hapoel Petach Tikva	1998–99	27	5	4	0	5	2				
Hapoel Haifa	1999–2000	5	2	0	0	0	0	3	0	8	2
Beitar Jerusalem	1999–2000	16	5	1	0	0	0	0	0	17	5
Maccabi Haifa	1999–2000	13	2	3	0	0	0	0	0	16	2
Maccabi Haifa	2000–01	35	3	0	0	2	1	2	1	39	5
Maccabi Haifa	2001–02	18	1	1	0	3	1	1	0	2	2
Maccabi Netanya	2002–03	21	9	0	0	3	2	0	0	24	11
Career total		423	113								

=== International ===
Appearances and goals by national team and year
National team	Year	Apps	Goals
Israel	1989	2	0
Israel	1990	3	0
Israel	1991	0	0
Israel	1992	1	0
Israel	1993	12	1
Israel	1994	6	0
Israel	1995	3	1
Israel	1996	5	1
Israel	1997	1	0
Total		33	3

Scores and results list Israel's goal tally first, score column indicates score after each Atar goal.

List of international goals scored by Reuven Atar
No.	Date	Venue	Opponent	Score	Result	Competition
1	13 October 1993	Parc des Princes, Paris, France	France		3–2	1994 FIFA World Cup 2004 qualifying
2	20 September 1995	Teddy Stadium, Jerusalem, Israel	Uruguay		3–1	Friendly
3	21 February 1996	Kiryat Eliezer Stadium, Haifa, Israel	Lithuania		4–2	Friendly

== Managerial statistics ==
Team	Nat	From	To	Record				
Team	Nat	From	To	P	W	D	L	Win %
Maccabi Netanya	(Israel)	21 February 2004	14 May 2006	94	38	23	33	40.43
Maccabi Herzliya	(Israel)	21 July 2006	7 November 2006	13	2	5	6	15.38
Maccabi Netanya	(Israel)	3 January 2007	1 June 2008	66	32	21	13	48.48
Beitar Jerusalem	(Israel)	3 September 2008	26 May 2009	45	23	8	14	51.11
Maccabi Netanya	(Israel)	29 September 2009	12 May 2012	112	47	27	38	41.96
Maccabi Haifa	(Israel)	1 July 2012	13 November 2012	13	3	6	4	23.08
Maccabi Netanya	(Israel)	19 March 2013	18 May 2013	6	2	2	2	33.33
Hapoel Haifa	(Israel)	12 May 2014	16 February 2015	30	10	5	15	33.33
Maccabi Netanya	(Israel)	6 November 2015	10 January 2016	9	0	4	5	0.00
Hapoel Afula	(Israel)	20 January 2017	2 August 2017	18	4	10	4	22.22
Ashdod	(Israel)	3 August 2017	3 October 2017	9	1	1	7	11.11
Total				414	162	111	141	39.13

== Honours ==
=== Player ===
Maccabi Haifa

- Israeli Premier League: 1988–89, 1990–91, 1993–94, 2000–01, 2001–02
- State Cup: 1991, 1993; runner-up 1987, 1989, 2002
- Toto Cup: 1993–94

=== Manager ===
Maccabi Netanya

- Toto Cup (Leumit): 2004–05
- Israeli Second Division runner-up: 2004–05
- Israeli Premier League runner-up: 2006–07, 2007–08

Beitar Jerusalem

- State Cup: 2009
