= Gadi Zelniker =

Israeli footballer

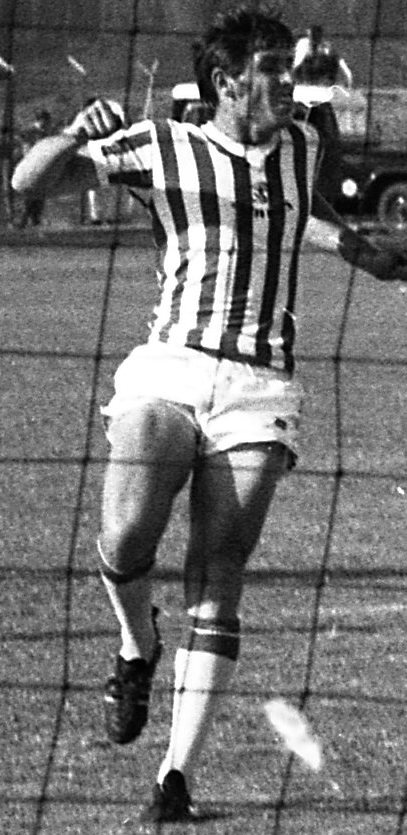
- Zelniker in 1969

Personal information
- Date of birth: 12 March 1944
- Place of birth: Jerusalem, Mandatory Palestine
- Date of death: 1 March 2016 (aged 71)

International career
Years	Team	Apps	(Gls)
1965	Israel	3	(0)

Gadi Zelniker (Hebrew: גדי צלניקר; 12 March 1944 – 1 March 2016) was an Israeli footballer. He played in three matches for the Israel national football team in 1965.
