= List of people from Maryland =

State flag of Maryland

Location of Maryland in the United States

The following are some notable people from the American state of Maryland, listed by their field of endeavor. This list may not include federal officials and members of the United States Congress who live in Maryland but are not actual natives.

== Politicians, jurists, and statesmen ==
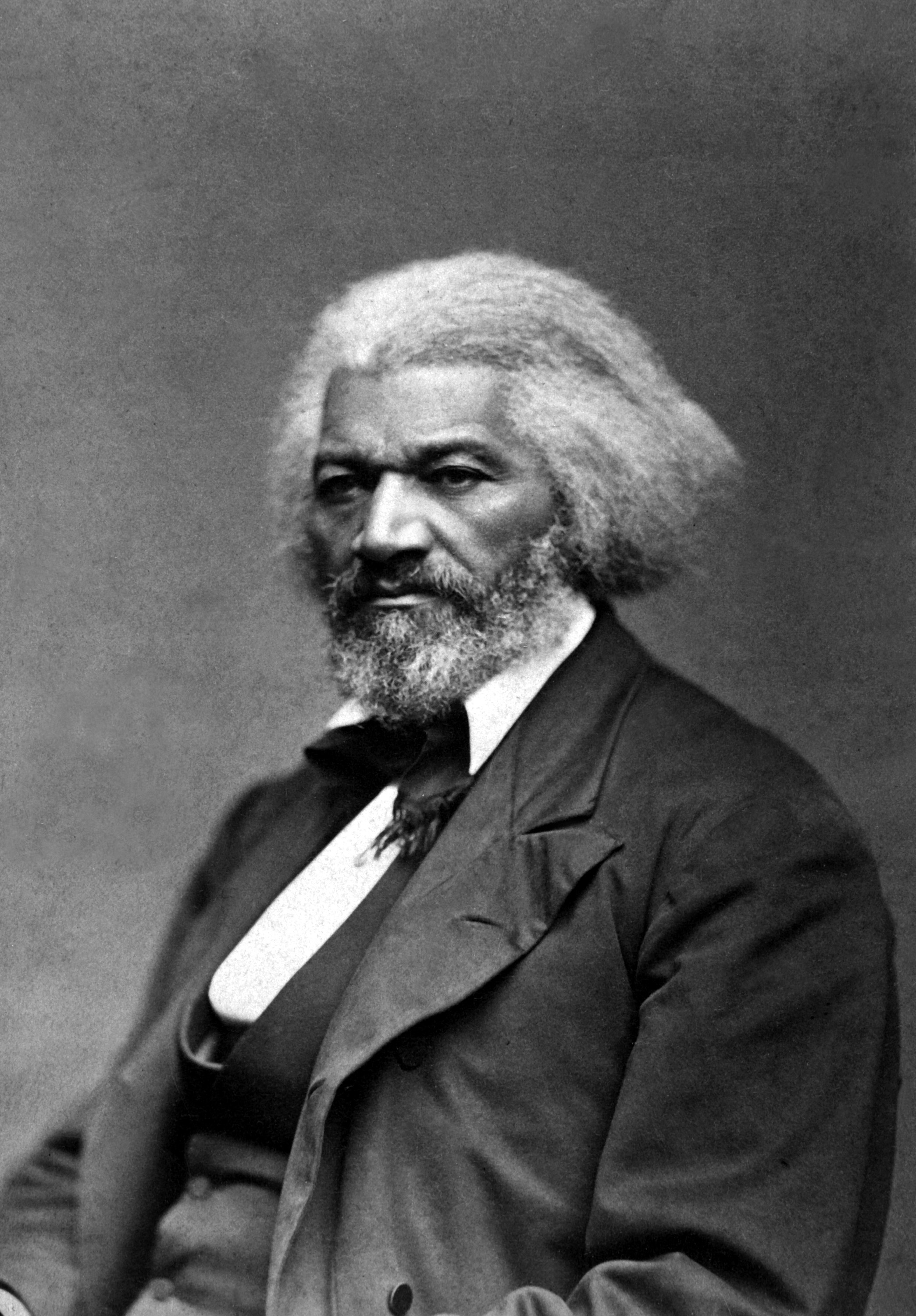
Frederick Douglass

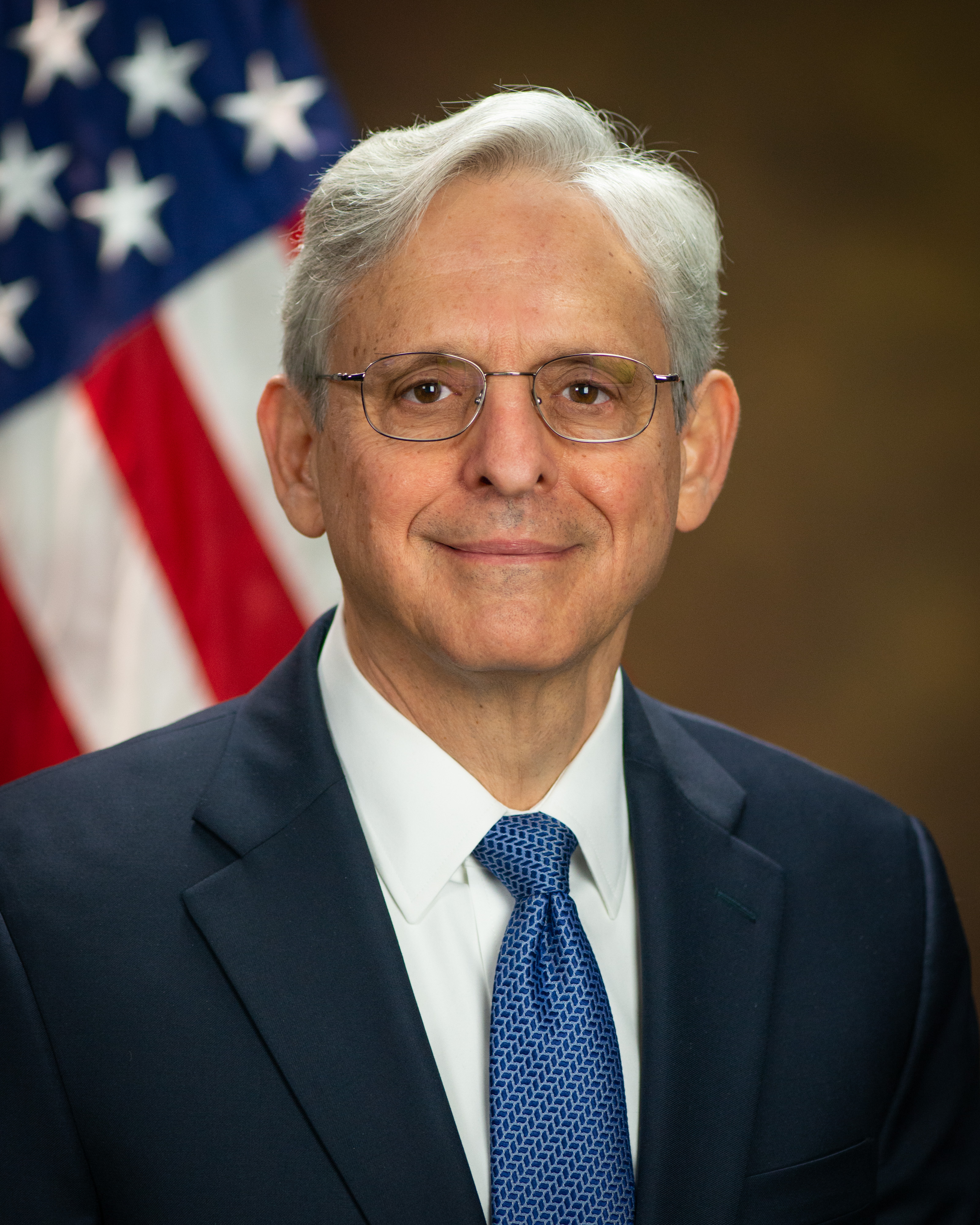
Merrick Garland

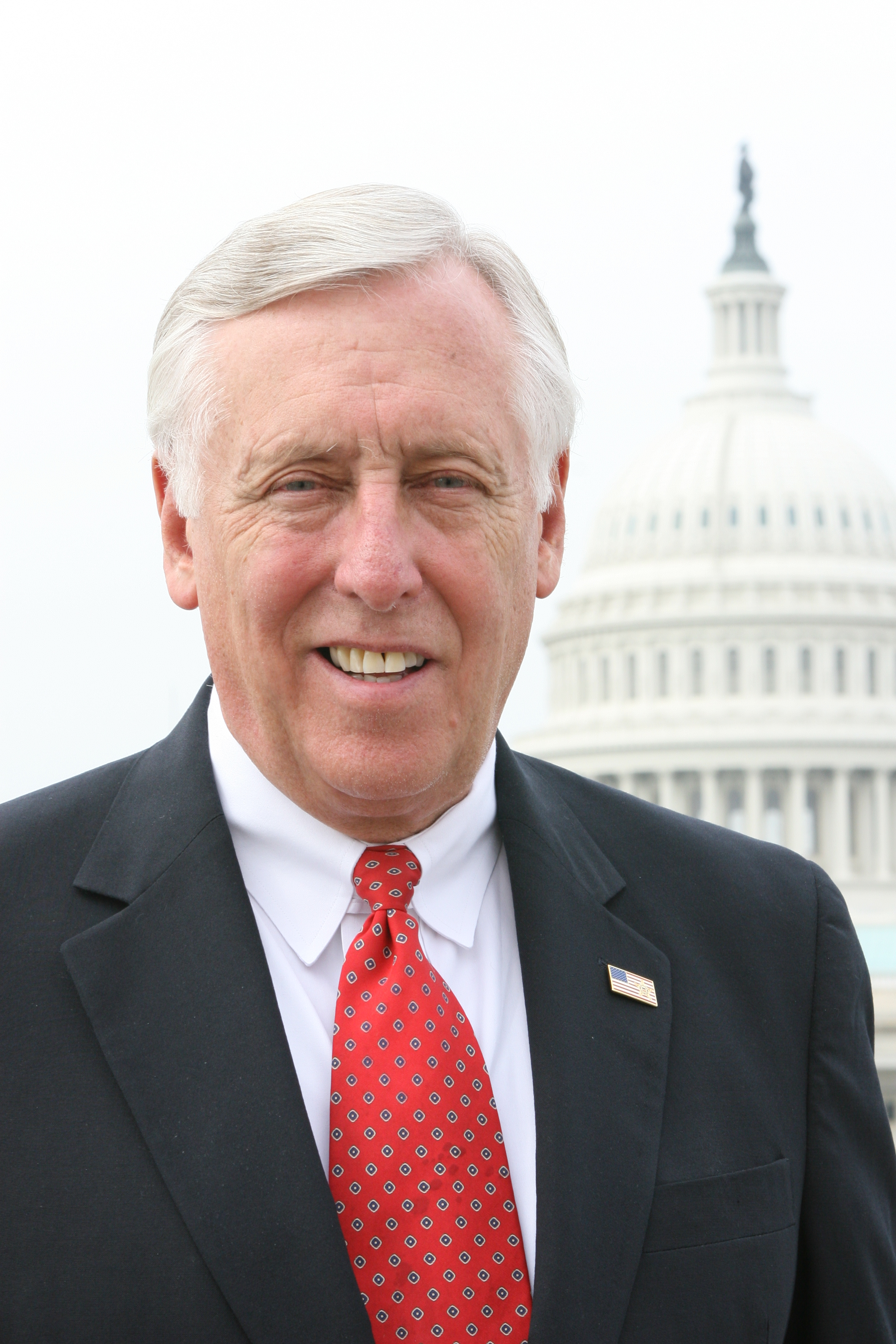
Steny Hoyer

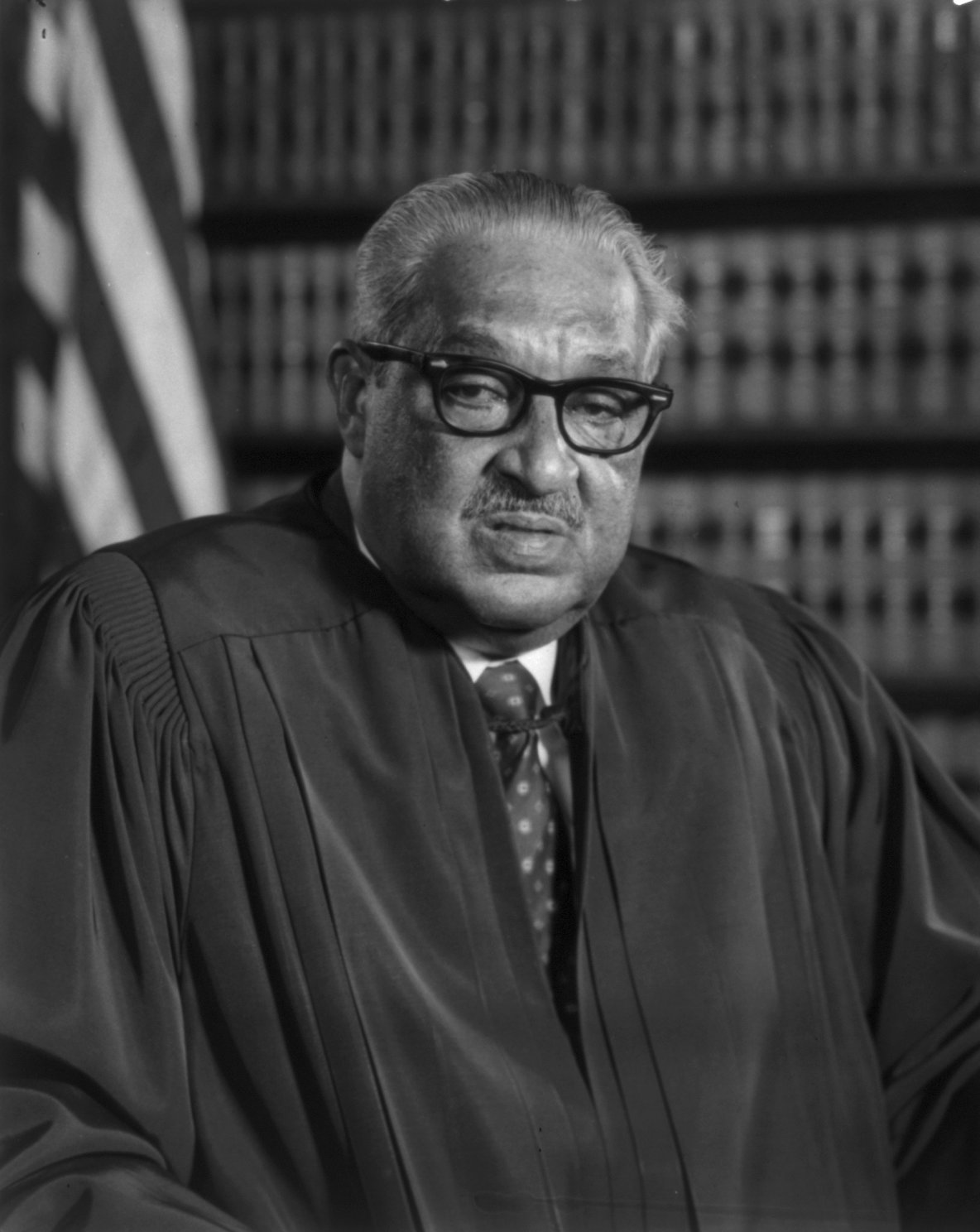
Thurgood Marshall

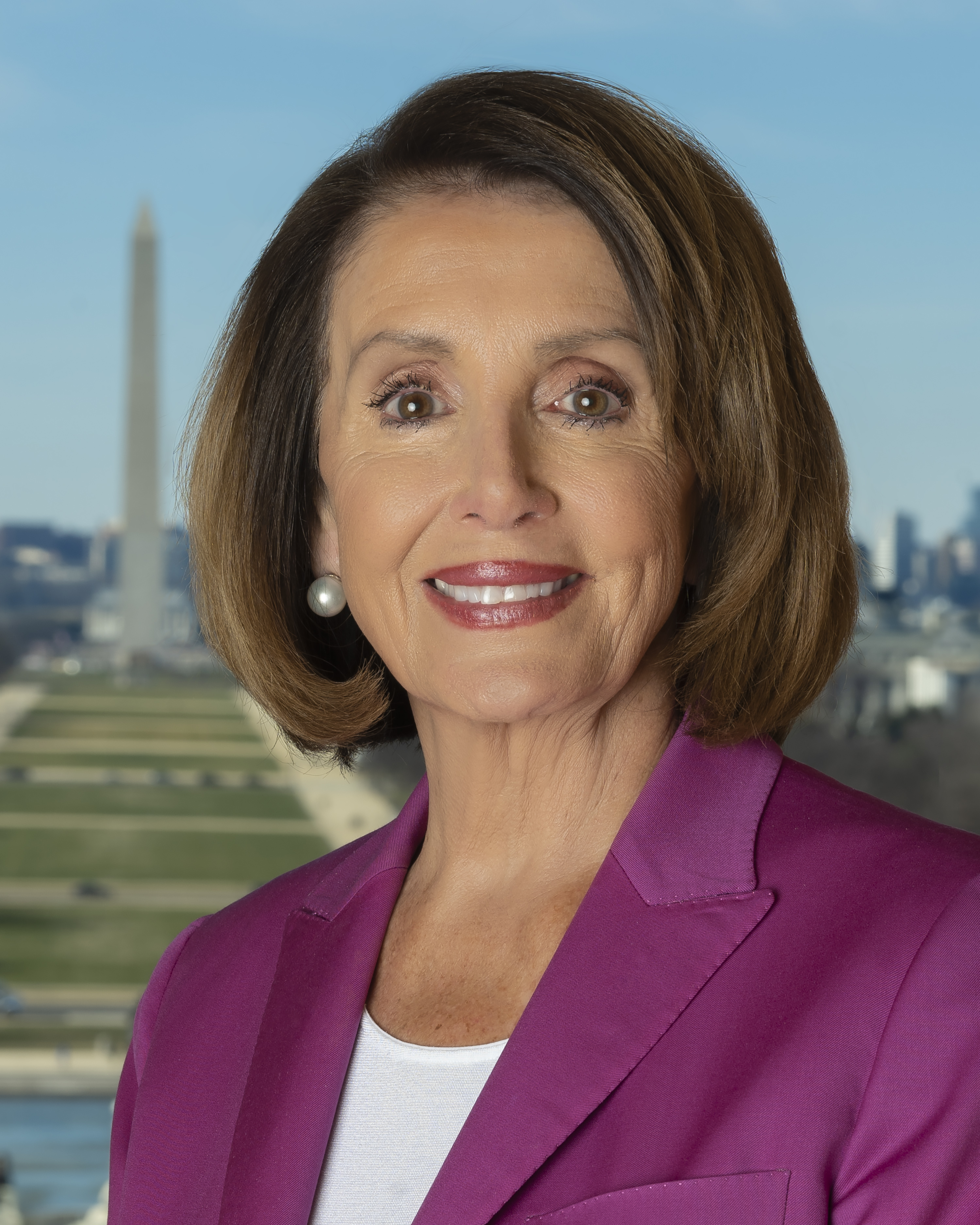
Nancy Pelosi

- Spiro T. Agnew, former governor of Maryland and vice president of the United States
- John R. Bolton, 25th U.S. ambassador to the United Nations
- Charles Joseph Bonaparte, former attorney general of the United States; founder of the FBI; grand-nephew of French emperor Napoleon I
- Anthony Brown, United States congressman, former lieutenant governor of Maryland
- Charles Carroll of Carrollton, lawyer, politician, and signer of the Declaration of Independence
- John Lee Carroll, 36th governor of Maryland
- Samuel Chase, United States Supreme Court Justice
- Joan Claybrook, president of Public Citizen; head of the NHTSA in the Carter administration
- J. Joseph Curran Jr., state attorney general and former lieutenant governor
- Frederick Douglass, abolitionist
- Doug Duncan, county executive
- Robert L. Ehrlich Jr., former governor of Maryland and member of the U.S. House of Representatives
- Christopher Emery, assistant White House chief usher
- Merrick Garland, U.S. attorney general
- John Hanson, ninth president of the Continental Congress; first elected under the Articles of Confederation
- Ellen Lipton Hollander, United States district judge of the United States District Court for the District of Maryland
- Steny Hoyer, current and former House majority leader, U.S. House of Representatives
- Sarah T. Hughes, federal judge who administered the presidential oath of office to Lyndon B. Johnson
- Brett Kavanaugh, associate justice of the Supreme Court of the United States
- Philip Barton Key, U.S. representative and U.S. district judge
- Allan H. Kittleman, former Maryland state senator and county executive for Howard County, Maryland
- Ernest Lyon, former U.S. ambassador to Liberia and founder of Maryland Industrial and Agricultural Institute for Colored Youths
- Thurgood Marshall, first African-American Supreme Court justice in the history of the United States
- Kweisi Mfume, congressman and former NAACP leader
- J. William Middendorf, United States diplomat, secretary of the Navy
- Aruna Miller, lieutenant governor of Maryland and former Maryland state delegate
- Charles E. Miller, politician, businessman, and philanthropist
- Wes Moore, author, nonprofit executive and current governor of Maryland
- David Nolan, activist and politician
- Johnny Olszewski, Baltimore County executive and former Maryland state delegate
- Katie O'Malley, state district judge and wife of Martin O'Malley
- Martin J. O'Malley, former governor of Maryland and 2016 candidate for president of the United States
- William Paca, signer of the Declaration of Independence
- Nancy Pelosi, former speaker of the United States House of Representatives
- Edgar Allan Poe, Maryland attorney general (1911–1915)
- John P. Poe Sr., attorney general of Maryland (1891–1895)
- Neilson Poe, judge for Baltimore City and grandfather of Poe brothers
- Kevin B. Quinn, chief executive officer and administrator of the Maryland Transit Administration
- William Donald Schaefer, former governor
- Sargent Shriver, politician, former vice presidential candidate
- Michael S. Steele, lieutenant governor of Maryland (2003–2007)
- Roger Taney, chief justice of the United States
- Kathleen Kennedy Townsend (Democratic Party), former lieutenant governor of Maryland and oldest daughter of Robert F. Kennedy
- Jeffrey Zients, director of the National Economic Council under President Barack Obama
- Dawn Zimmer, mayor of Hoboken, New Jersey

== Architects ==
- Otto Eugene Adams
- George Archer
- Richard Snowden Andrews
- Ephraim Francis Baldwin
- Henry F. Brauns
- William Buckland
- Wright Butler
- Charles L. Carson
- Albert Cassell
- Charles E. Cassell
- Thomas Dixon
- George A. Frederick
- Jackson C. Gott
- Nathaniel Henry Hutton
- William Rich Hutton
- Edmund George Lind
- J. Crawford Neilson
- John Rudolph Niernsee
- Edward L. Palmer Jr.
- Theodore Wells Pietsch, architect of Stieff Silver Company Factory (Baltimore)
- Bruce Price
- Howard Van Doren Shaw (died in Baltimore)
- Gideon Shryock
- Mathias Shryock (born in Frederick, Maryland)
- Joseph Evans Sperry
- Philip E. Thomas, first president of the Baltimore and Ohio Railroad
- John Appleton Wilson
- James Bosley Noel Wyatt

== Scientists and inventors ==
- Beatrice Aitchison, mathematician, statistician, topologist, and transportation economist
- Hattie Alexander, pediatrician and microbiologist, developed first effective remedies for Haemophilus influenzae
- Shirley Montag Almon, economist noted for the Almon lag model
- Richard R. Arnold, NASA astronaut, high school biology teacher
- Benjamin Banneker, surveyor, astronomer, mathematician and almanac author
- Brady Barr, herpetologist
- Ruth Bleier, neurophysiologist and feminist scholar
- Sergey Brin, co-founder of Google
- John H. Brodie, physicist
- Ben Carson, former neurosurgeon, politician, and 2016 presidential candidate
- Rachel Carson, environmentalist
- Teresa Cohen, mathematician
- Robert Curbeam, astronaut, engineer, and US naval officer
- George Dantzig, mathematical scientist
- George Delahunty, physiologist, endocrinologist, and professor at Goucher College
- Olive Dennis, railroad engineer and first female member of the American Railway Engineering Association
- Wendell E. Dunn Jr., chemical engineer, metallurgist, and inventor
- Roger L. Easton, principal inventor of GPS
- Charles Fefferman, mathematician
- Henry Gantt, mechanical engineer
- Solomon Golomb, mathematician who invented pentominoes
- Michael Griffin, NASA administrator
- Harold E. Harrison and Helen C. Harrison, husband-and-wife research team in pediatrics
- Ethel Browne Harvey, embryologist
- Arlo Hemphill, explorer/ocean conservationist
- Georgeanna Seegar Jones, reproductive endocrinologist
- Howard W. Jones, gynecological surgeon
- Thomas David Jones, NASA astronaut, US Air Force pilot
- Kate Breckenridge Karpeles, first woman to be appointed a contract surgeon by the United States Army
- Nick Katz, mathematician
- Mark Mattson, neuroscientist
- John Mauchly, physicist who, with J. Presper Eckert, invented the first general-purpose electronic computer
- Edmund McIlhenny, inventor of Tabasco brand pepper sauce
- Florence Marie Mears, mathematician
- Bessie Moses, gynecologist, obstetrician and Director of the Baltimore Bureau for Contraceptive Advice
- Ayub K. Ommaya, neurosurgeon
- Helen Dodson Prince, astronomer
- Mila Rechcigl, biochemist
- Robert Empie Rogers, chemist
- Arthur William Savage, inventor of the Savage Model 99
- Paul Reed Smith, luthier
- Elsie Shutt, computer programmer and founder of software company
- Terry W. Virts, NASA astronaut, US Air Force pilot
- Douglas C. Wallace, geneticist, evolutionary biologist
- John Archibald Wheeler, theoretical physicist
- Reid Wiseman, NASA astronaut, US Navy aviator
- Edward Witten, physicist, mathematician
- Jean Worthley, naturalist and TV host of Hodgepodge Lodge and On Nature's Trail
- Jill Zimmerman, computer scientist and professor at Goucher College

== Authors, journalists ==
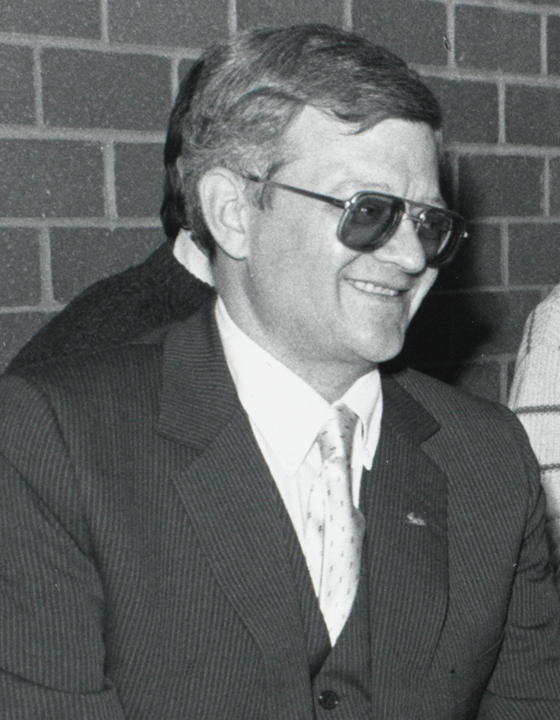
Tom Clancy

- Devin Allen, photojournalist and photographer
- John Barth, author
- Carl Bernstein, journalist and author
- Hanne Blank, author
- Ann Brashares, author
- Pat Brown, author, criminal profiler
- Emma Alice Browne, poet
- Mindie Burgoyne, author and businessperson
- Erin Burnett, journalist and CNN anchor
- James M. Cain, journalist and author
- Christine Michel Carter, author
- Kiran Chetry, journalist
- Connie Chung, television journalist
- Tom Clancy, author
- Lucille Clifton, poet
- Ta-Nehisi Coates, writer, journalist
- Annie McCarer Darlington, poet
- Mark Davis, columnist, radio talk show host
- Minnie S. Davis, author, mental scientist
- Frank Deford, journalist and author
- Matt Drudge, journalist, radio talk show host
- Alex Epstein, author, energy theorist
- Nellie Blessing Eyster, journalist, writer, reformer
- Roland Flint, poet
- Courtney Friel, entertainment reporter for Fox News
- Marianne Githens, political scientist, feminist, author, and professor
- Jesse Glass, poet, folklorist
- Meredith Goldstein, advice columnist and reporter
- Sara Haardt, author and professor
- Mary Downing Hahn, author
- Dashiell Hammett, author
- James Alexander Henshall, author
- Karen Hesse, author
- Nancy Hubbard, author and business professor
- Zora Neale Hurston, author
- Julia Ioffe (born 1982), journalist
- Mary E. Ireland, writer, translator, poet
- Nina Kasniunas, political scientist, author, and professor
- Sophie Kerr, author
- Michael Kimball, author
- Cliff Kincaid, investigative journalist
- Gayle King, editor
- Mel Kiper Jr., ESPN football analyst
- Munro Leaf, children's author
- Rick Leventhal, correspondent for Fox News
- Walter Lord, author
- H. L. Mencken, journalist and social critic
- Emily J. Miller, senior editor of Washington Times opinion pages
- Frank Miller, writer and artist
- Ogden Nash, humorous poet
- Suzan-Lori Parks, playwright and screenwriter
- Edgar Allan Poe, poet, writer, and literary critic
- Adrienne Rich, poet and feminist
- Hester Dorsey Richardson, writer
- Nora Roberts, author
- Thomas Roberts, news anchor for MSNBC
- John Thomas Scharf, author, historian, lawyer, politician, and Confederate soldier and sailor
- Karl Shapiro, poet
- Laura Amy Schlitz, children's literature author
- Upton Sinclair, author
- Norman Solomon, journalist, media critic
- Bud Sparhawk, science fiction author
- John Steadman, sportswriter
- Flora E. Strout, teacher, social reformer, non-fiction writer, lyricist
- Mary Spear Tiernan, writer
- Anne Tyler, author
- Sanford J. Ungar, journalist and Goucher College president emeritus
- Leon Uris, author
- Scott Van Pelt, ESPN anchor and radio host
- Amelia B. Coppuck Welby, poet
- Fredricka Whitfield, CNN reporter and anchor
- Emma Howard Wight, writer, newspaper correspondent
- Michael Wilbon, ESPN personality (Pardon the Interruption) and The Washington Post sports columnist
- Ella B. Ensor Wilson, social reformer, non-fiction writer
- Ibbie McColm Wilson, poet
- James Wolcott, journalist, social critic

== Musicians ==
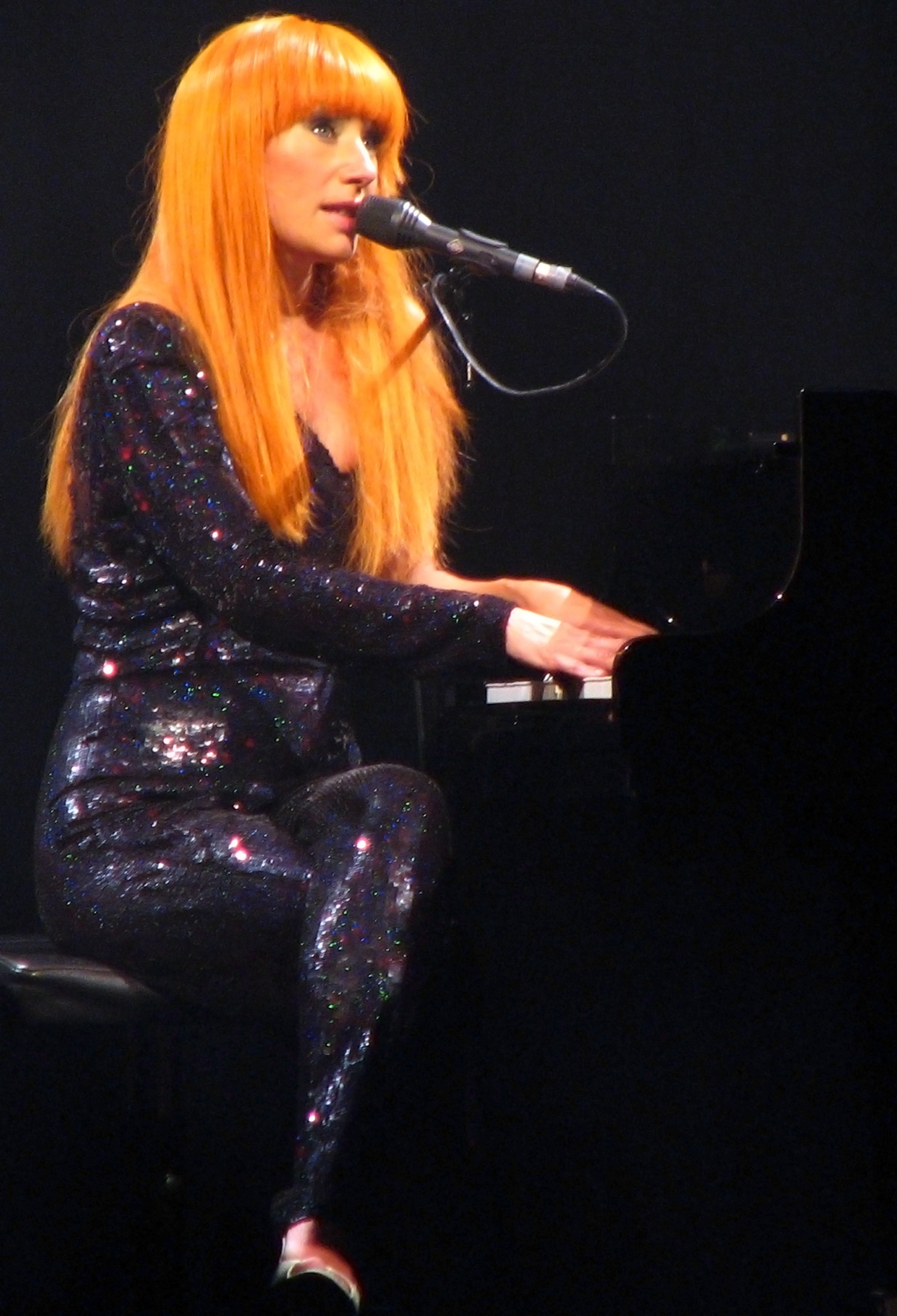
Tori Amos

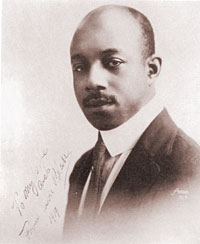
Eubie Blake

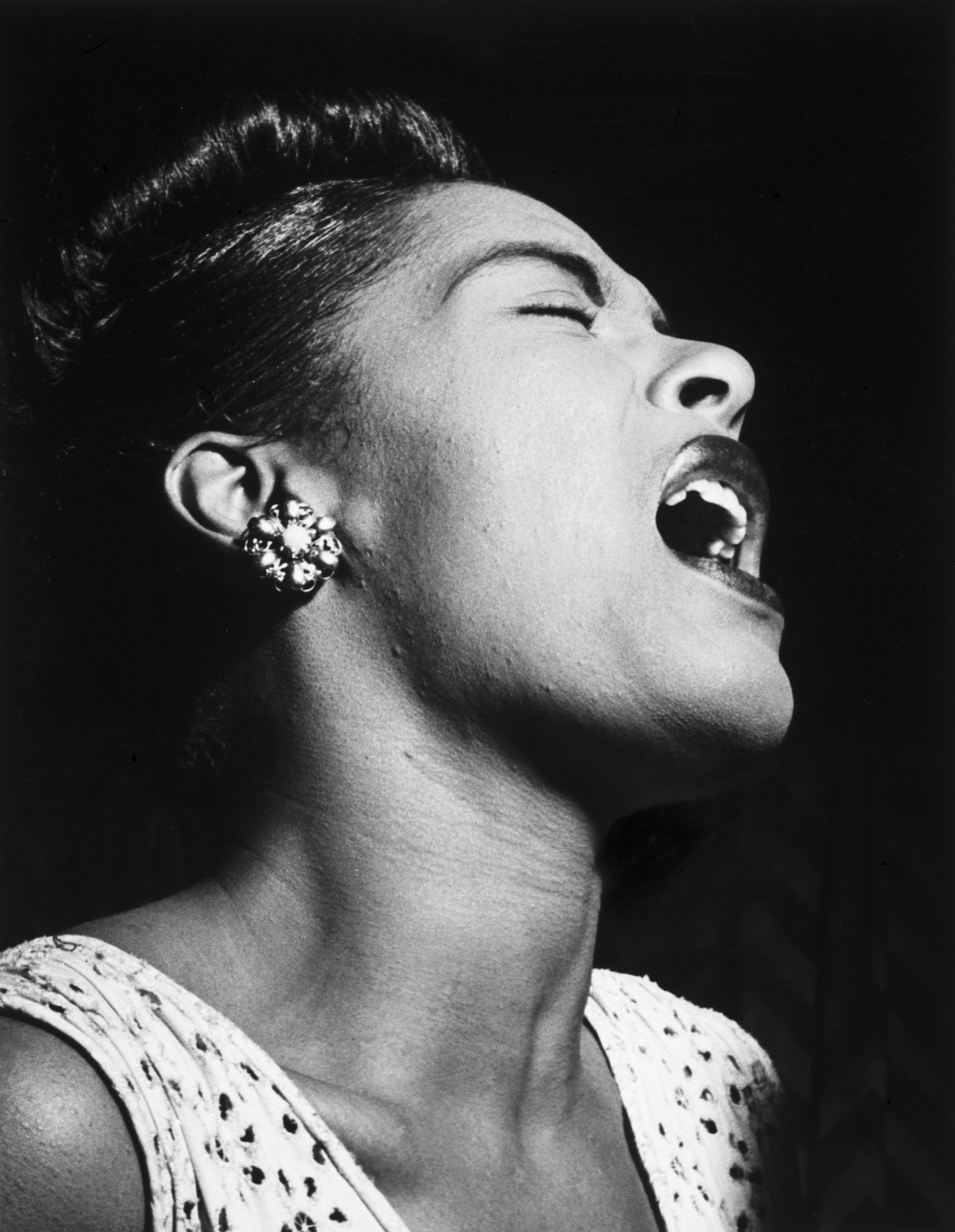
Billie Holiday

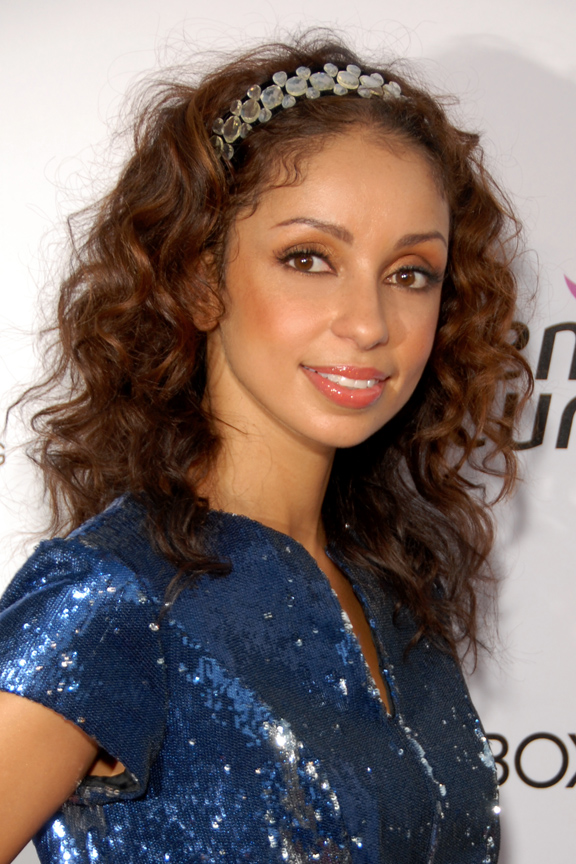
Mýa

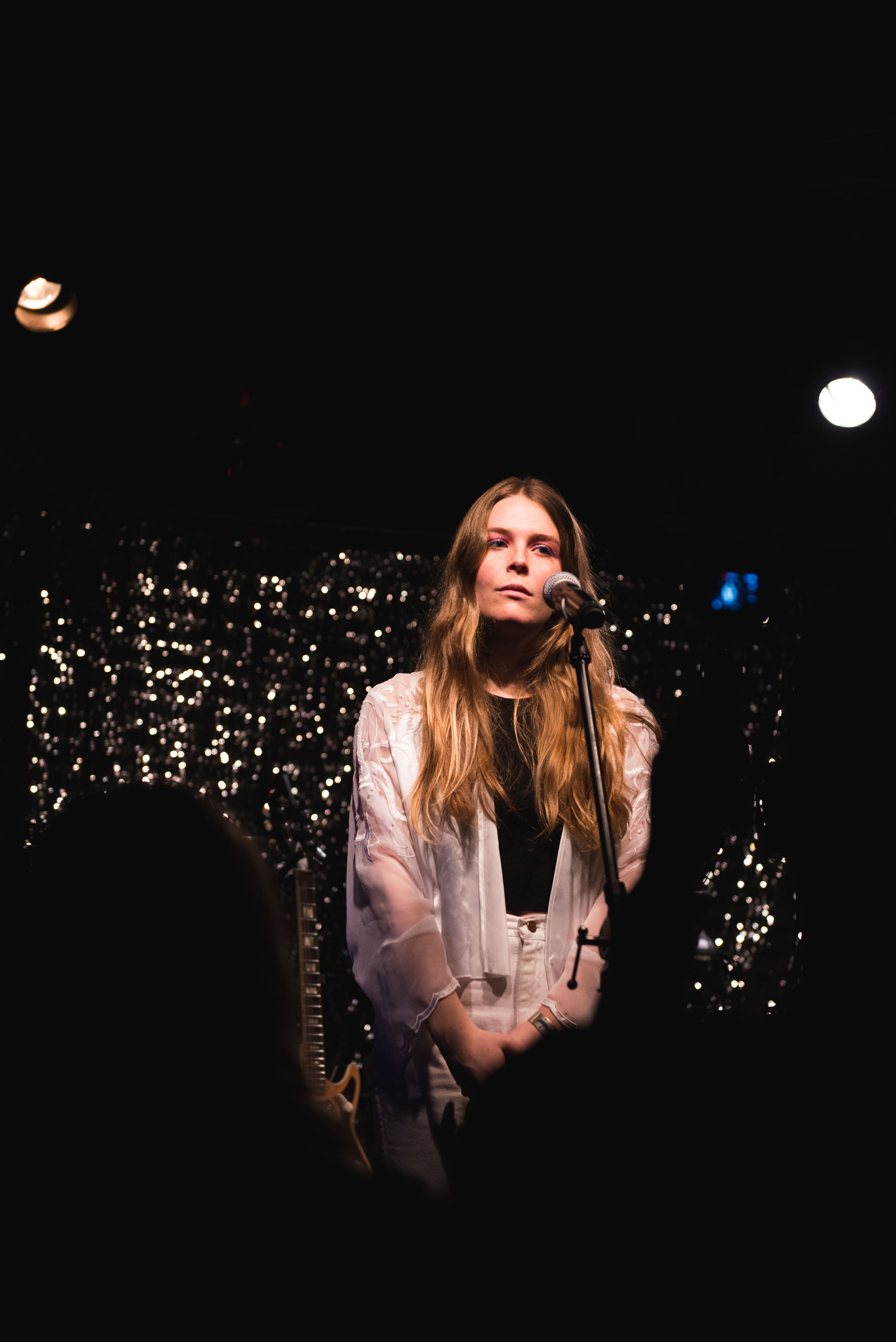
Maggie Rogers

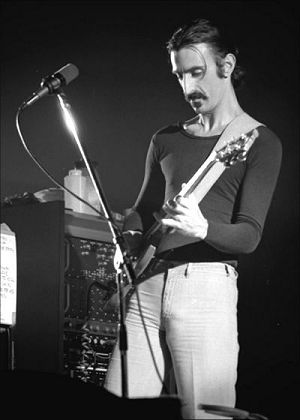
Frank Zappa

- Bernard Addison, jazz guitarist
- Scott Ambush, jazz bassist
- Tori Amos, singer-songwriter
- BT, born Brian Transeau, electronic musician
- Jack Barakat, lead guitarist of the rock band All Time Low
- Niki Barr, singer-songwriter
- Keter Betts, jazz bassist
- Eubie Blake, ragtime, jazz and pop composer, lyricist
- Bossman, rapper
- Toni Braxton, singer
- Mark Bryan, guitarist for the rock band Hootie & the Blowfish
- Randy Blythe, vocalist for heavy metal band Lamb of God
- David Byrne, singer/guitarist of rock band Talking Heads
- Bill Callahan, singer/songwriter formerly known as Smog
- Cab Calloway, jazz singer and bandleader
- Eva Cassidy, singer-songwriter
- Cex, electronic musician
- JC Chasez, singer, songwriter, dancer, actor, producer, and member of pop group *NSYNC
- John Christ, former guitarist of the hard rock band Danzig
- Cordae, rapper
- Rian Dawson, drummer for the band All Time Low
- Dan Deacon, electronic musician
- Deakin (Joshua Dibb), co-founder of Animal Collective
- Jeff Draco, independent singer, songwriter, producer, and multi-instrumentalist
- John Duff, singer-songwriter
- Adam Duritz, singer of rock band Counting Crows
- Cass Elliot, singer of pop band The Mamas & the Papas
- Sam Endicott, singer of rock band The Bravery
- Entrance, born Guy Blakeslee, singer/songwriter
- John Fahey, folk/blues guitarist
- Brent Faiyaz, singer, record producer
- Neil Fallon, lead singer for the band Clutch
- Mark Fax, composer
- Dean Felber, bass guitarist for the rock band Hootie & the Blowfish
- Gallant, singer-songwriter
- Alex Gaskarth, lead singer and guitarist for the rock band All Time Low
- Johnny Gill, singer
- Danny Gatton, guitarist
- Geologist (Brian Weltz), co-founding member of Animal Collective
- Ginuwine, R&B singer
- Philip Glass, composer
- Robert Gordon, rockabilly singer
- Tamyra Gray, singer/actress
- Hilary Hahn, concert violinist, two-time Grammy winner
- Greg Hawkes, keyboardist of The Cars
- Billie Holiday, singer
- Ron Holloway, tenor saxophonist
- Scott Hull, guitarist, music producer
- Eric Hutchinson, musician
- JPEGMafia, music producer, experimental hip hop artist
- Julienne Irwin, singer and America's Got Talent season 2 finalist
- Joan Jett, singer
- LaKisha Jones, American Idol season 6 finalist
- Tonie Joy, guitarist for Moss Icon
- Camara Kambon, film composer, songwriter, music producer, pianist
- Tommy Keene, singer-songwriter
- Greg Kihn, New Wave and pop musician and singer
- Joe Lally, bassist of rock band Fugazi
- Nathan Larson, film soundtrack composer; guitarist of rock bands Shudder to Think and Hot One
- Rod Lee, Baltimore club producer/DJ
- Victoria Legrand, vocalist and keyboardist for Beach House
- Lisa Loeb, singer-songwriter
- Nils Lofgren, solo rock musician and guitarist with Bruce Springsteen's E Street Band
- Logic, rapper
- Benji Madden, guitarist for Good Charlotte
- Joel Madden, lead singer for Good Charlotte
- Spiro Malas, bass-baritone opera singer
- Mario, singer-songwriter
- Sean Meadows, bass guitarist for Lungfish
- Zachary Merrick, bassist and vocals for the rock band All Time Low
- Christina Milian, singer-songwriter, actress, dancer
- Jamie Miller, drummer for Bad Religion
- Jason C. Miller, singer-songwriter
- Mýa, singer/songwriter and dancer
- Rico Nasty, rapper
- Ric Ocasek, former frontman of The Cars
- John and T.J. Osborne, members of the band Brothers Osborne
- Panda Bear (Noah Lennox), co-founding member of Animal Collective
- Barry Louis Polisar, singer-songwriter of children's music
- Greg Puciato, singer of metal band The Dillinger Escape Plan
- Ross Rawlings, pianist, composer, conductor, and music director
- Sam Ray, electronic music as Ricky Eat Acid, and founder of band American Pleasure Club, formerly known as Teen Suicide
- Steve Rochinski, jazz guitarist, recording artist, composer, arranger, author, jazz educator
- Chrisean Rock, rapper
- Maggie Rogers, singer-songwriter and producer
- Alex Scally, instrumentalist and songwriter for Beach House
- Gina Schock, drummer of rock band The Go-Go's
- Sisqó, lead singer of R&B group Dru Hill
- Todd Smith, vocalist, songwriter, and guitarist for Dog Fashion Disco, Polkadot Cadaver, and Knives Out!
- Noel Paul Stookey, singer with Peter, Paul and Mary
- Avey Tare (David Portner), co-founding member of Animal Collective
- Evan Taubenfeld, ex-guitarist and backup vocalist for pop star Avril Lavigne; singer and rhythm guitarist for The Black List Club
- Chad Taylor, guitarist for The Gracious Few and Live
- Chester Thompson, drummer, frequent collaborator with Genesis
- Jordan Tice, bluegrass guitarist and singer, band member of Hawktail
- Ultra Naté, house music/dance-pop musician
- Chick Webb, jazz and swing drummer and bandleader
- Scott "Wino" Weinrich, doom metal guitarist and vocalist
- Erica Wheeler, folk singer-songwriter
- Frank Zappa, singer, guitarist and composer

== Actors, filmmakers, and entertainers ==
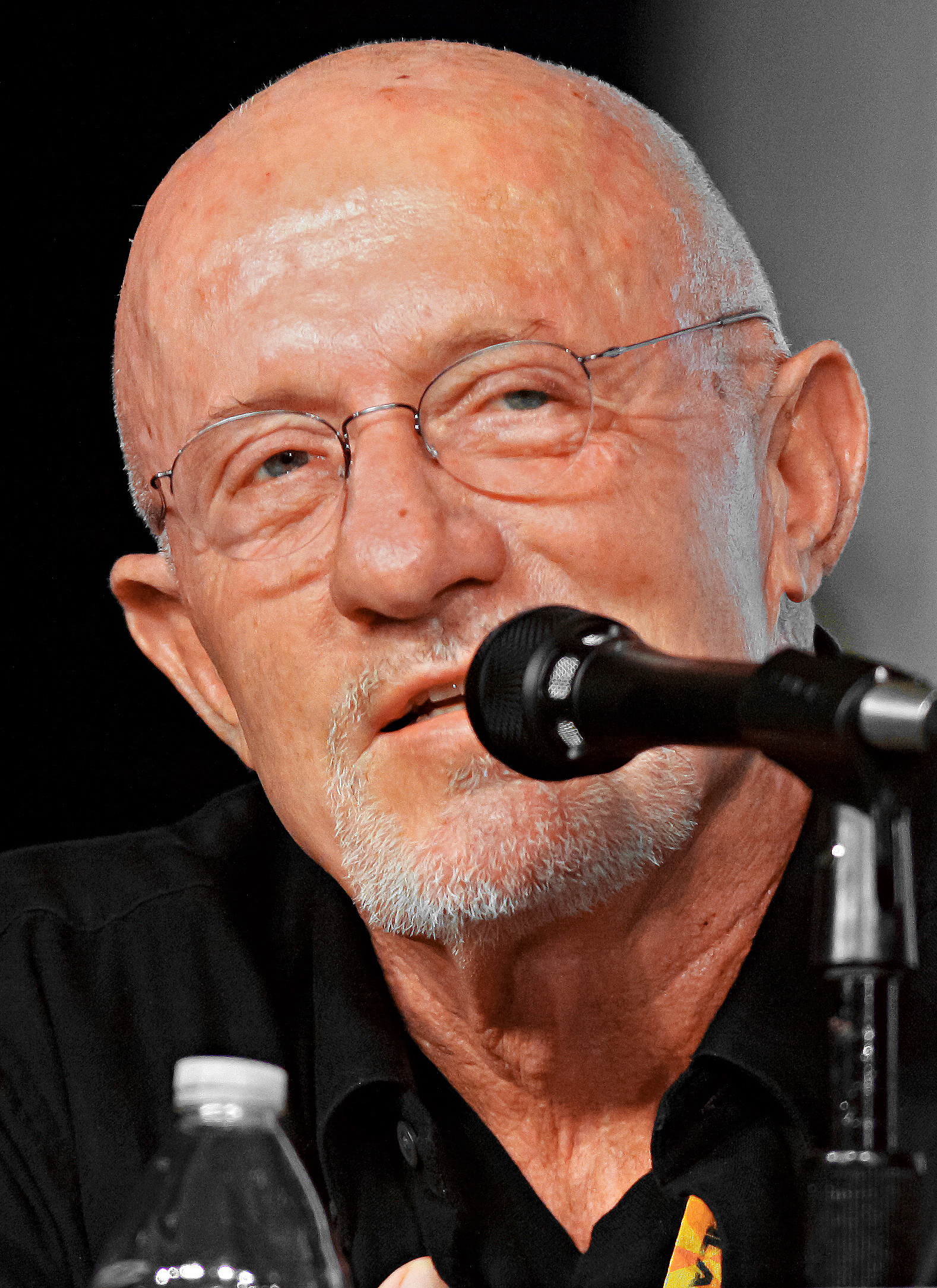
Jonathan Banks

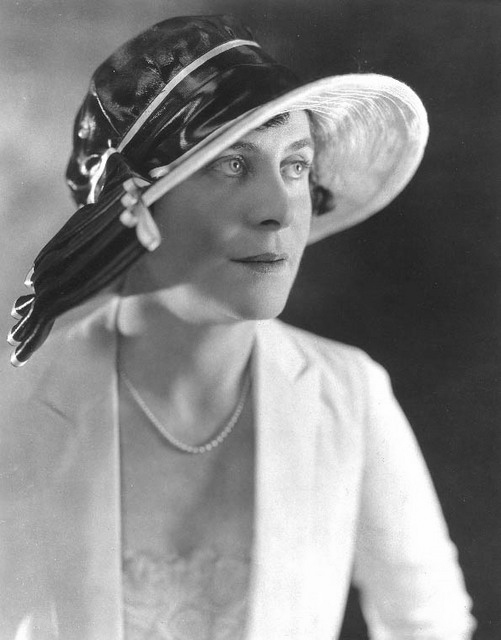
Clara Beranger

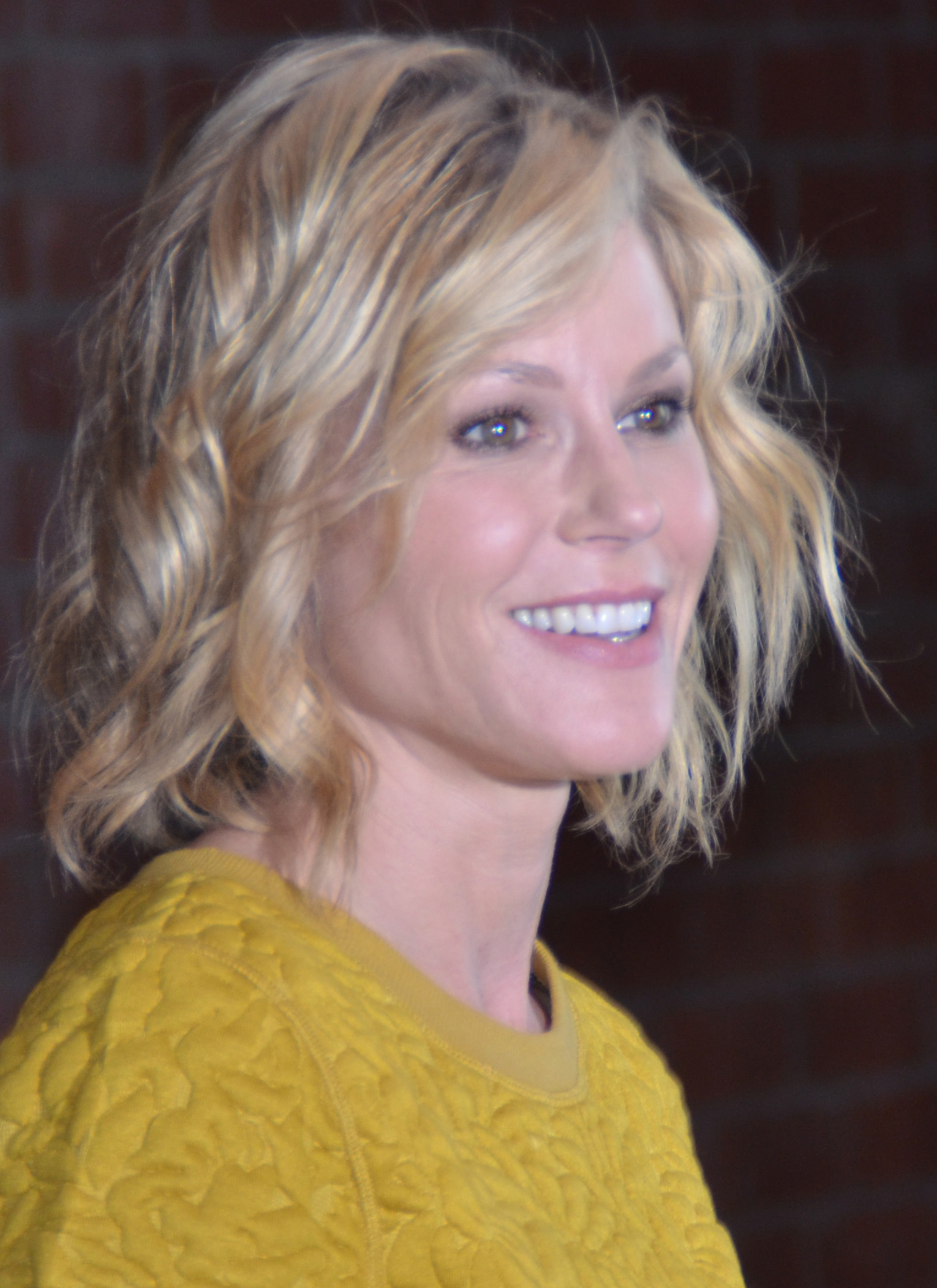
Julie Bowen

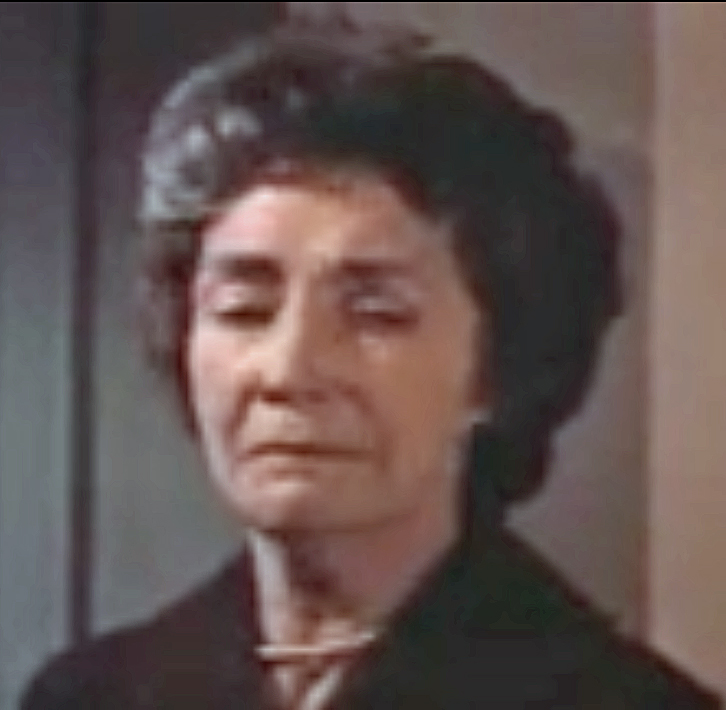
Mildred Dunnock

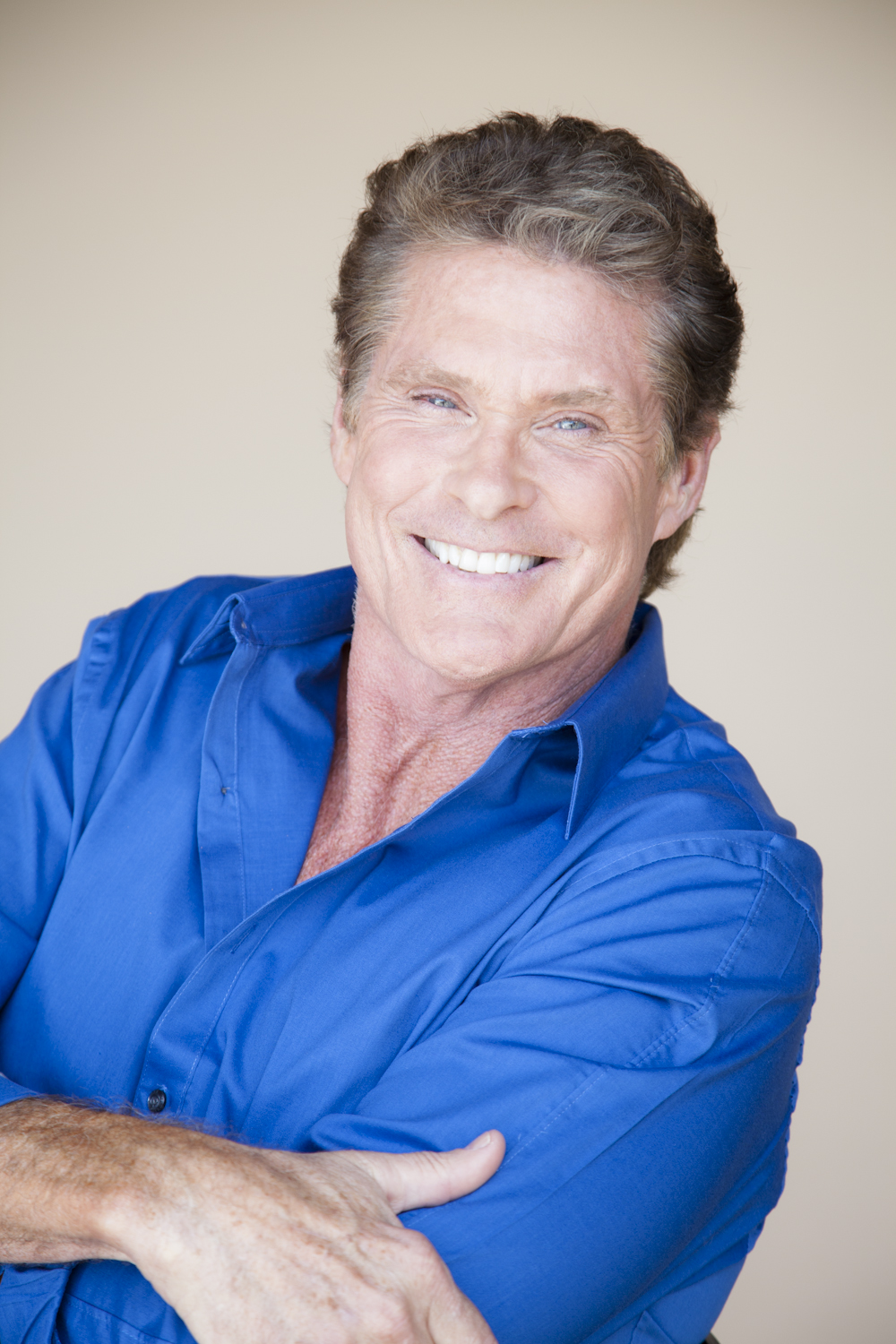
David Hasselhoff

Goldie Hawn

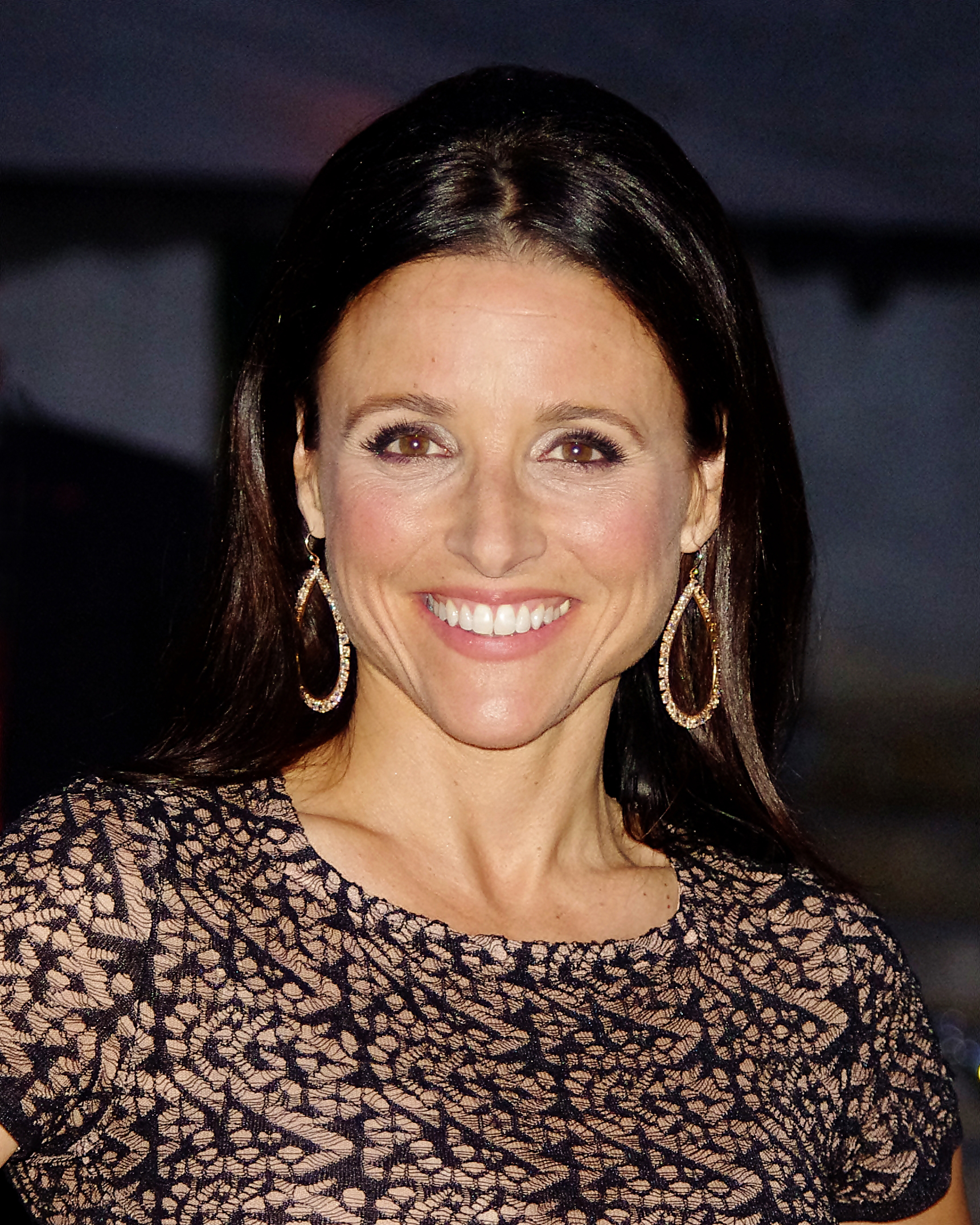
Julia Louis-Dreyfus

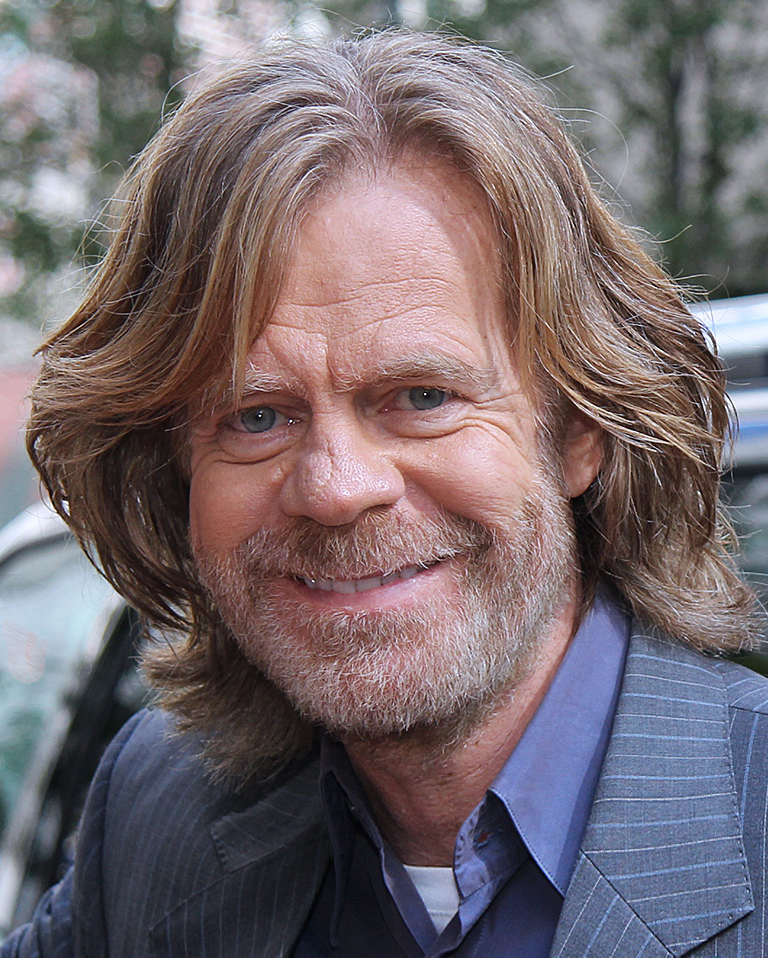
William H. Macy

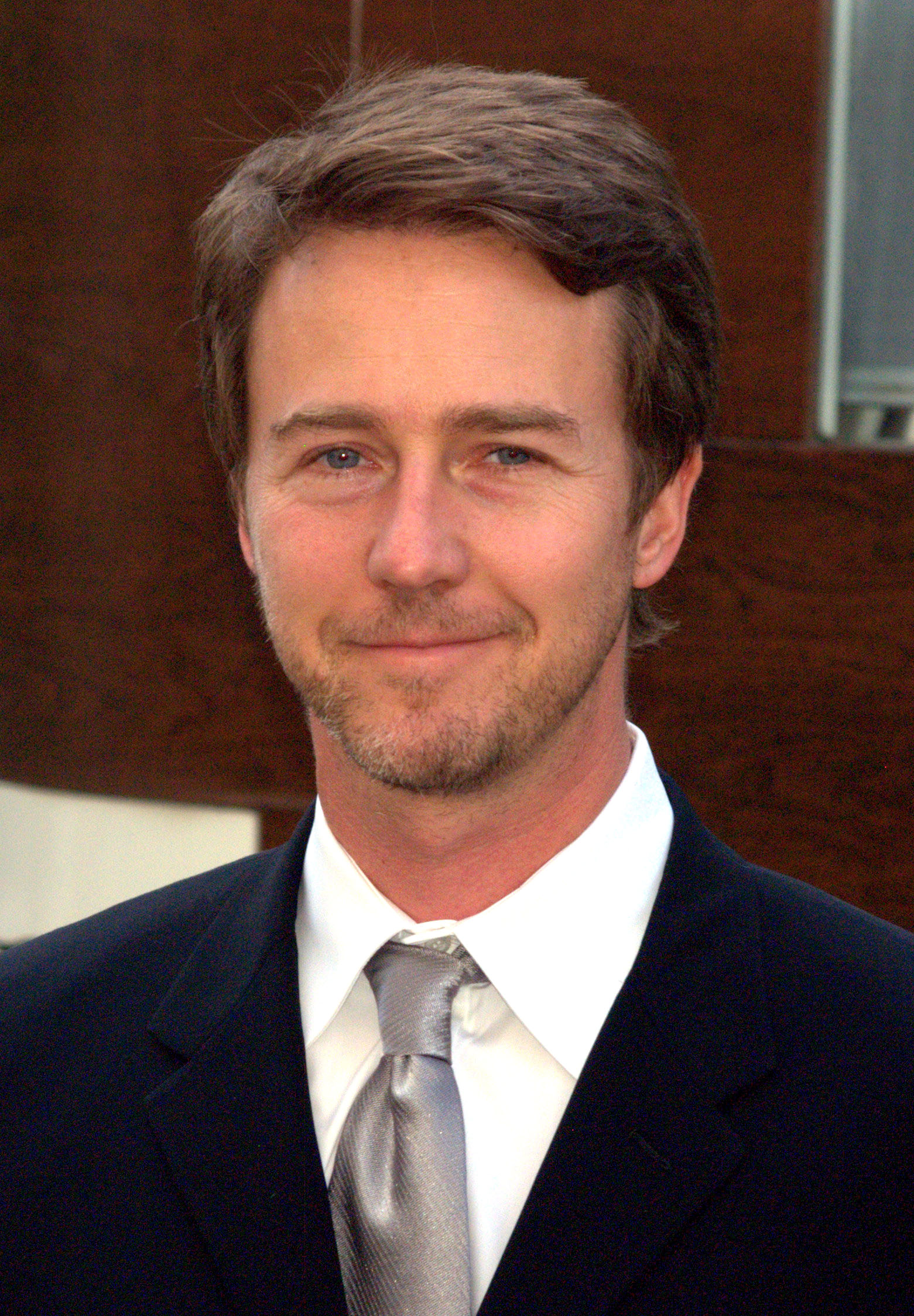
Edward Norton

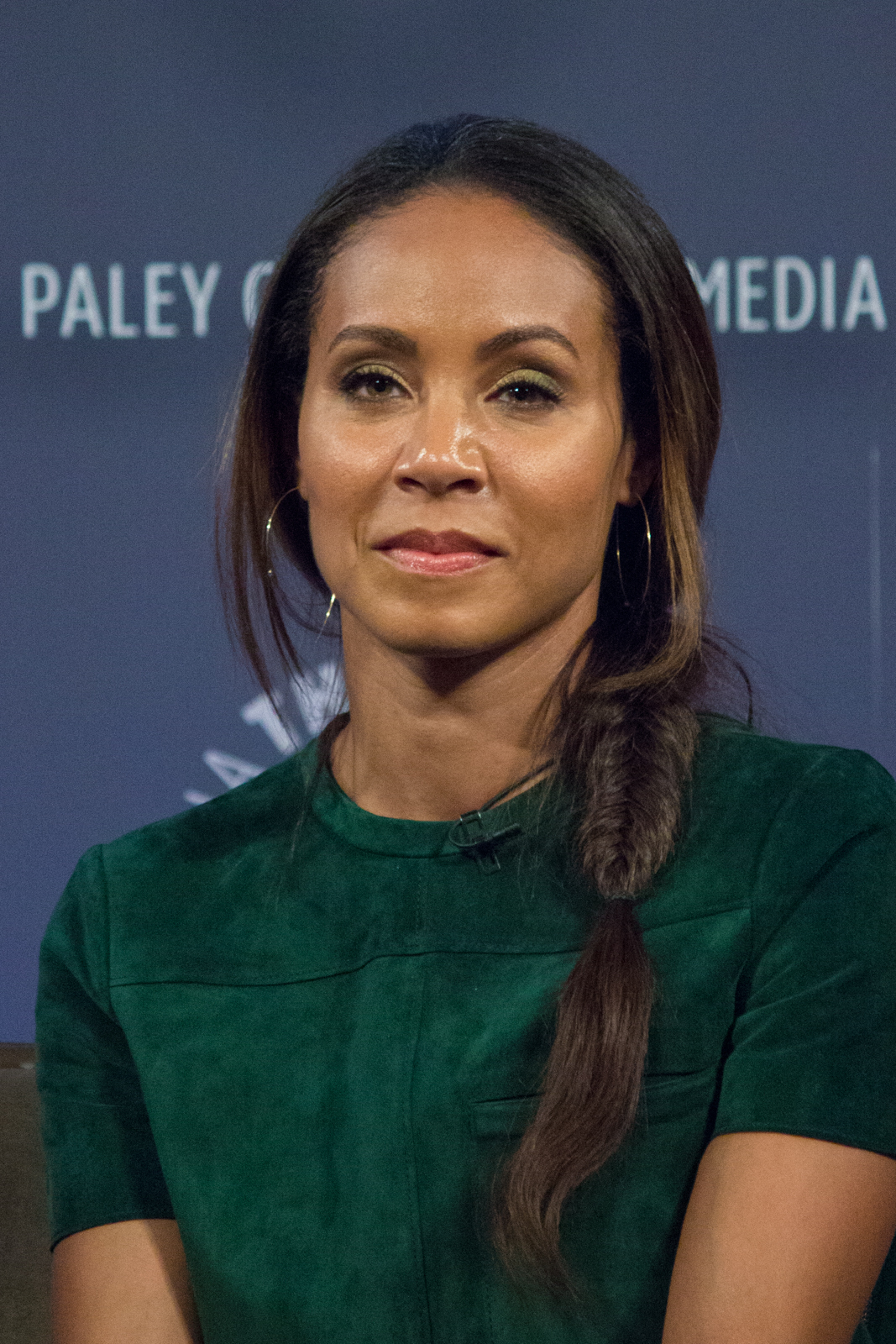
Jada Pinkett-Smith

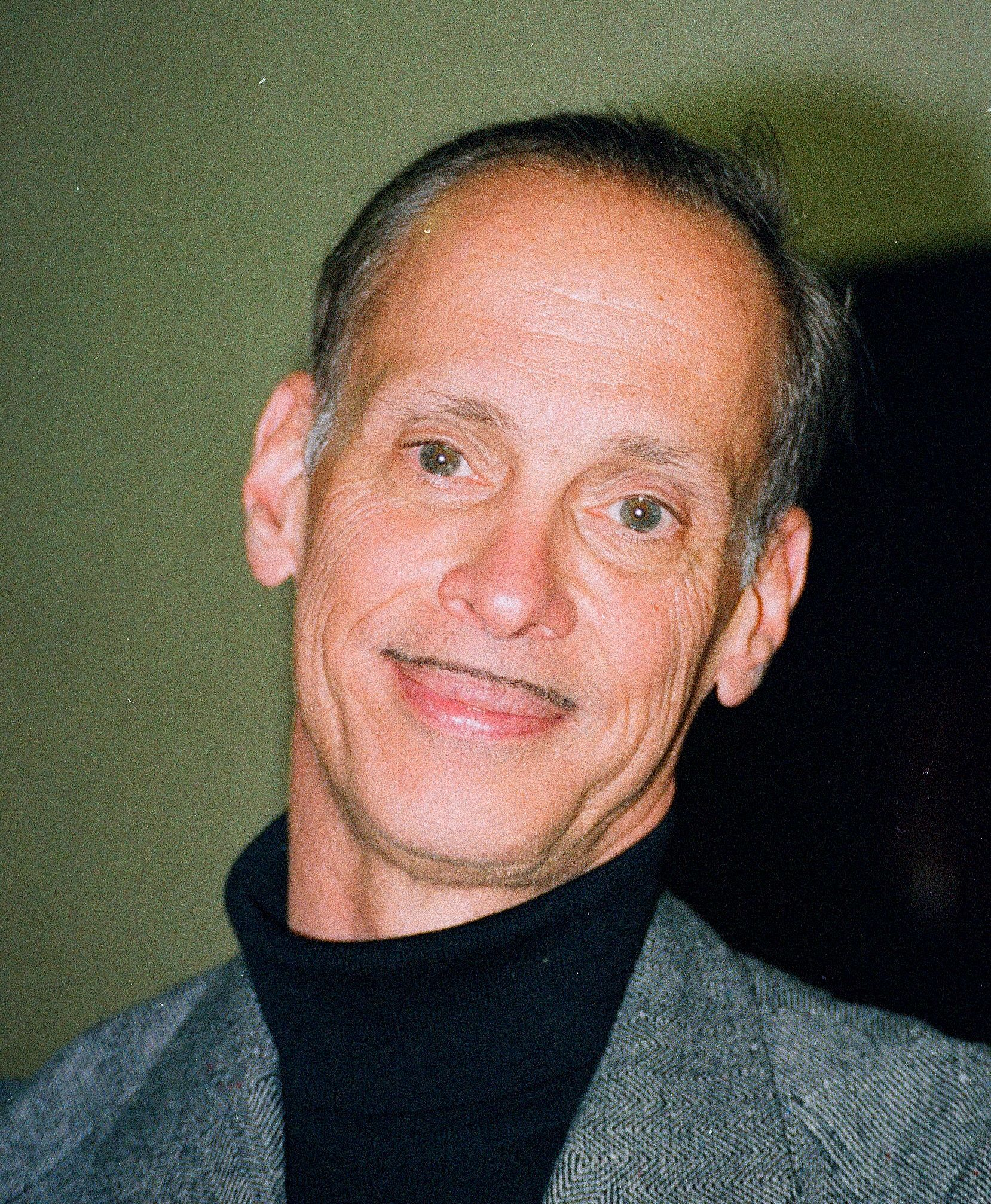
John Waters

- Cynthia Addai-Robinson, actress
- Gbenga Akinnagbe, actor
- Lori Alan, voice actress
- Karen Allen, actress
- Utkarsh Ambudkar, actor
- Bess Armstrong, actress
- Jay Ashley, pornographic film star
- John Astin, actor
- Jonathan Banks, actor
- Noelle Beck, actress
- Clara Beranger, silent film screenwriter
- Lewis Black, comedian, actor
- Wolfgang Bodison, actor
- Edwin Booth, actor
- Julie Bowen, actress
- Tamar Braxton, actress, television personality, and musician (The Real, Dancing with the Stars)
- Kimberly J. Brown, actress
- Norman "Chubby" Chaney, actor (Little Rascals, Our Gang shorts)
- Crystal Chappell, actress
- Josh Charles, actor
- Hank Chen, actor
- Josh Clark, actor
- Kevin Clash, puppeteer
- Gaelan Connell, actor, singer
- Hans Conried, actor
- Whitney Cummings, stand-up comedian
- Brian Dannelly, film director and screenwriter
- Tommy Davidson, actor, comedian
- Wendy Davis, actress
- Eddie Deezen, actor
- Alexis Denisof, actor
- Divine, actor, drag queen
- Jack Douglass, Internet personality, comedian
- David Drake, playwright, actor, stage director
- Mildred Dunnock, actress
- Charles Dutton, actor
- Michael Ealy, actor
- Johnny Eck, actor, circus performer (Tod Browning's Freaks)
- Damon Evans, actor
- Anna Faris, actress
- Evan Farmer, actor, singer
- Lauren Faust, animator
- Faith Fay, actress
- Wayne Federman, comedian, actor, author
- Katie Feeney, social media personality
- Ben Feldman, actor
- Steven Thomas Fischer, director, producer, cartoonist
- Mona Freeman, actress
- Judah Friedlander, comedian, actor
- Daniel Gallant, writer, producer and director of Nuyorican Poets Café
- Kathie Lee Gifford, TV personality and singer
- Anita Gillette, actress
- Larry Gilliard Jr., actor
- Ira Glass, radio personality, producer
- John Glover, actor
- Duff Goldman, television personality
- George O. Gore II, actor
- Alfred Gough, screenwriter and producer
- Holter Graham, actor
- Stavros Halkias, comedian, actor, podcaster
- Linda Hamilton, actress
- Brandon Hardesty, actor
- Ian Harding, actor
- Linda Harrison, actress
- David Hasselhoff, actor
- Shawn Hatosy, actor
- Rondo Hatton, actor
- Goldie Hawn, actress
- Robert Hays, actor
- Elden Henson, actor
- Taraji P. Henson, actress
- Russell Hicks, actor
- Brendan Hines, actor, singer
- Anne Hummert, creator of daytime radio serials
- Michael Hyatt, actress
- Mo'Nique Imes-Jackson, actress
- Thomas Jane, actor
- Penny Johnson Jerald, actress
- Rian Johnson, filmmaker
- Spike Jonze, music video director, filmmaker, and producer
- Kevin Kangas, writer, director of B-horror movies
- John Kassir, actor, comedian
- Stacy Keibler, actress, model
- Josh Kelly
- Kevin Kilner, actor
- Judy Kuhn, actress
- Martin Lawrence, actor, comedian, director and producer
- Mina Le, fashion YouTuber, podcaster, and content creator
- Barry Levinson, filmmaker
- Peyton List, actress, model
- Ernie Lively, actor
- Julia Louis-Dreyfus, actress
- William H. Macy, actor
- Paula Marshall, actress
- Shane McMahon, professional wrestler
- Dale Midkiff, actor
- Debra Monk, actress, singer
- Garry Moore, television personality
- Cookie Mueller, actress, writer
- Sean Murray, actor
- Mildred Natwick, actress
- Toby Orenstein, theatre producer and founder
- Devika Parikh, actress
- Jameson Parker, actor
- Nicole Ari Parker, actress
- Mark Pellington, film director
- Sam Phillips, actress, model, radio DJ
- David Pollock, actor
- Parker Posey, actress
- Robin Quivers, radio personality
- Lance Reddick, actor
- Patricia Richardson, actress
- Howard Rollins, actor
- Mark Rolston, actor
- Jessica Lee Rose, actress
- John Rothman, actor
- Thomas Rothman, film executive
- Mike Rowe, TV personality
- Lamman Rucker, actor
- Johnathon Schaech, actor, writer
- Richard Schiff, actor
- Dwight Schultz, actor
- Teddy Sears, actor
- Anna Deavere Smith, actress, playwright
- Jada Pinkett Smith, actress
- Daniel Stern, actor
- Mink Stole, actress
- Rebecca Sugar, animator, singer-songwriter, and screenwriter
- Wanda Sykes, comedian, actress
- Tracie Thoms, actress
- Barbara Walsh, actress
- Jonathan Ward, actor
- John Waters, filmmaker
- Matthew Weiner, writer, director and producer
- Montel Williams, TV personality
- DeWanda Wise, actress
- Frank Zappa, musician, composer

== Athletes ==
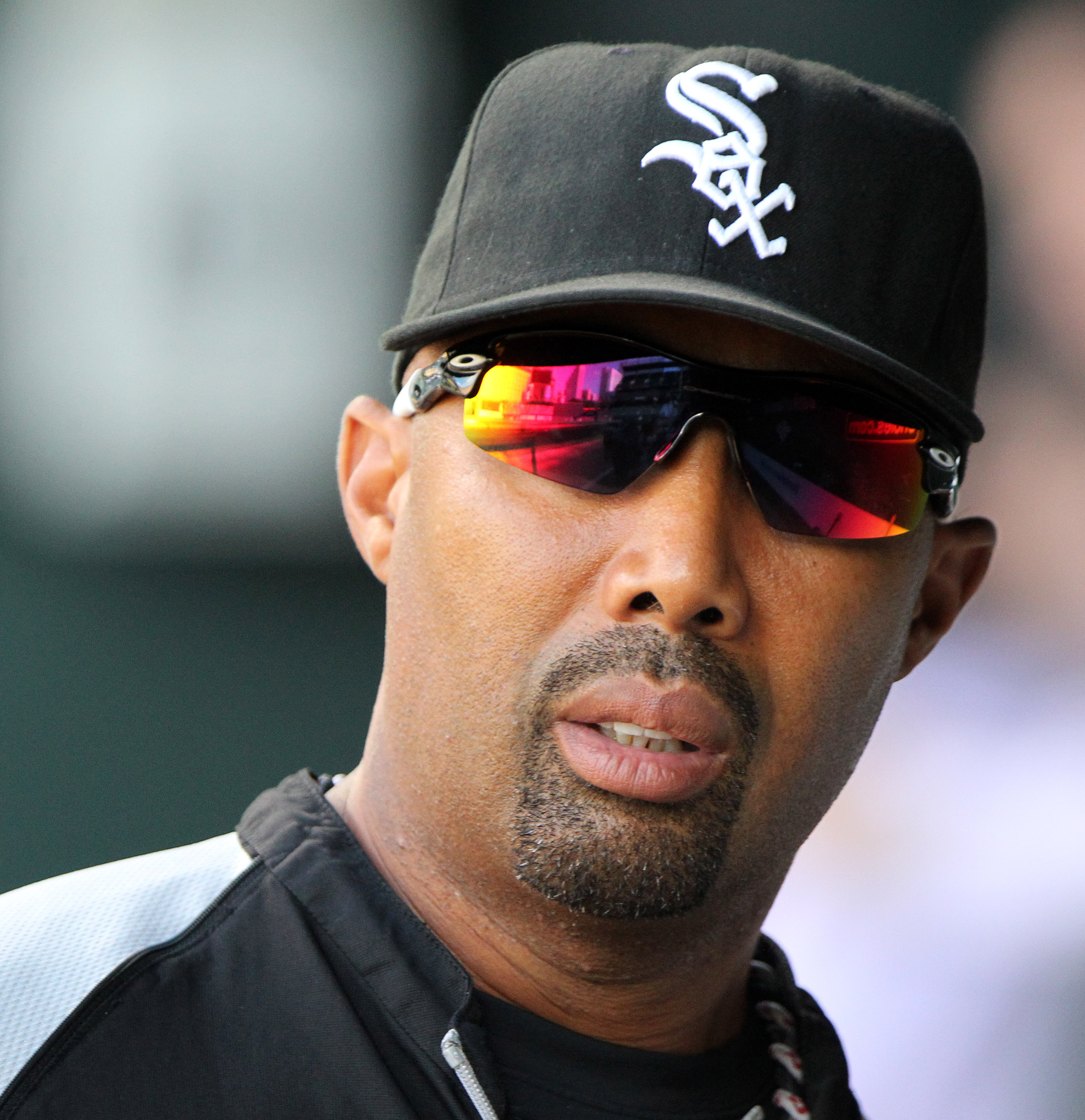
Harold Baines

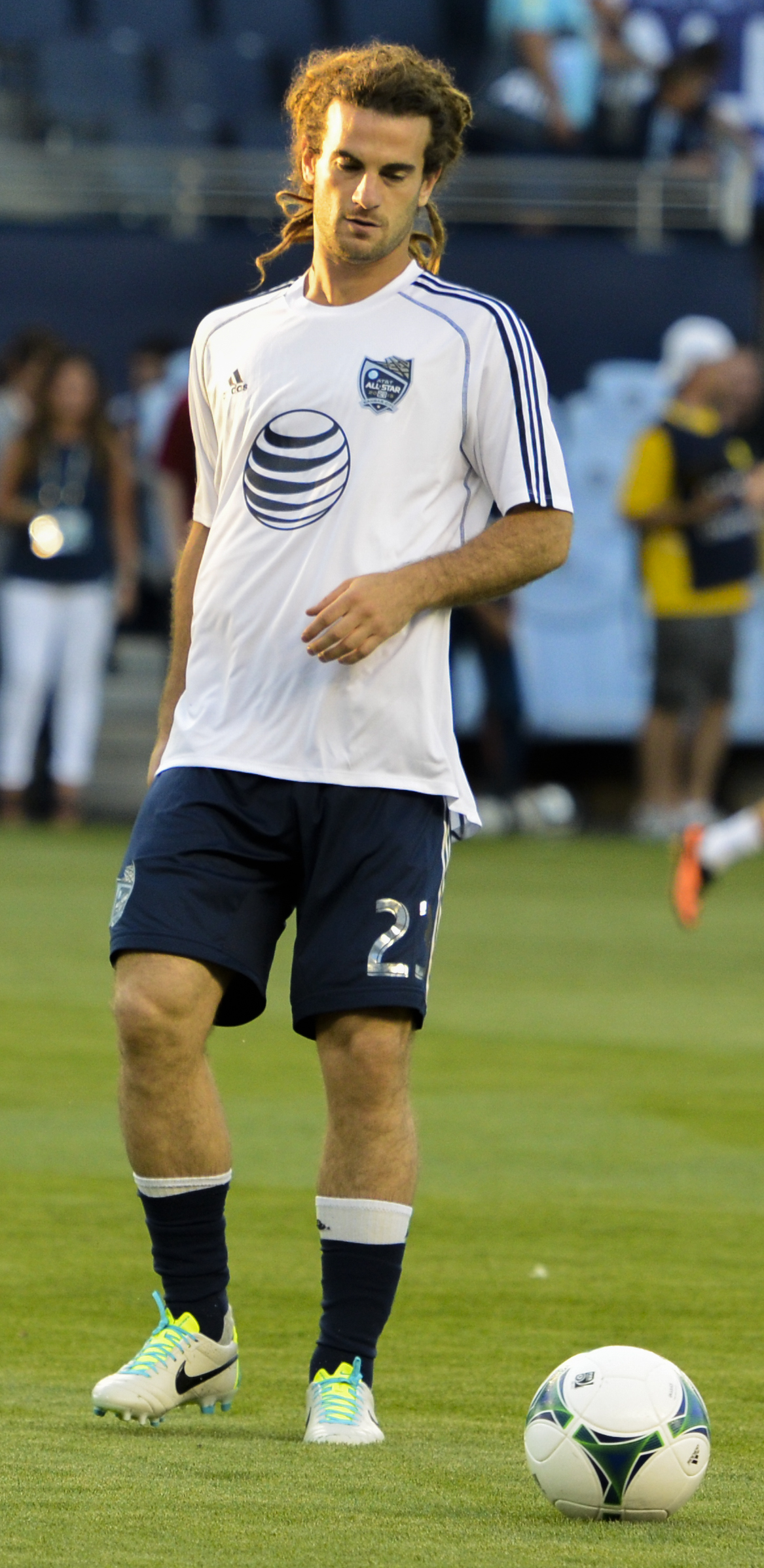
Kyle Beckerman

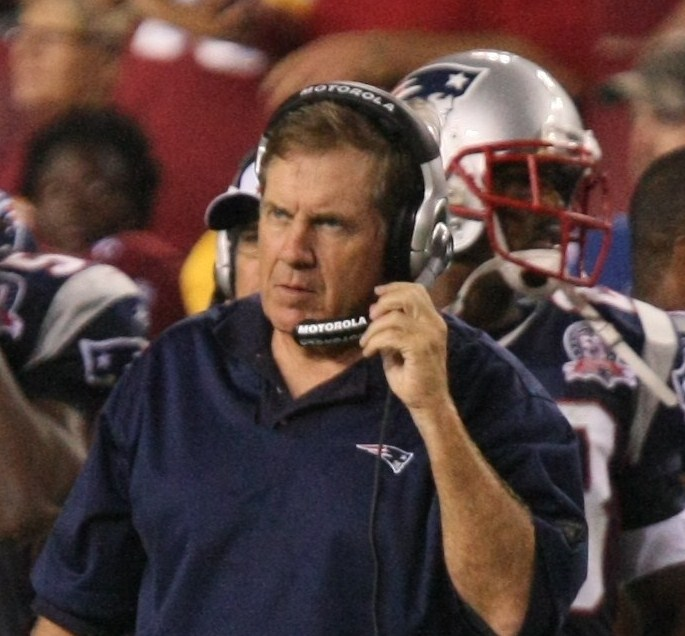
Bill Belichick

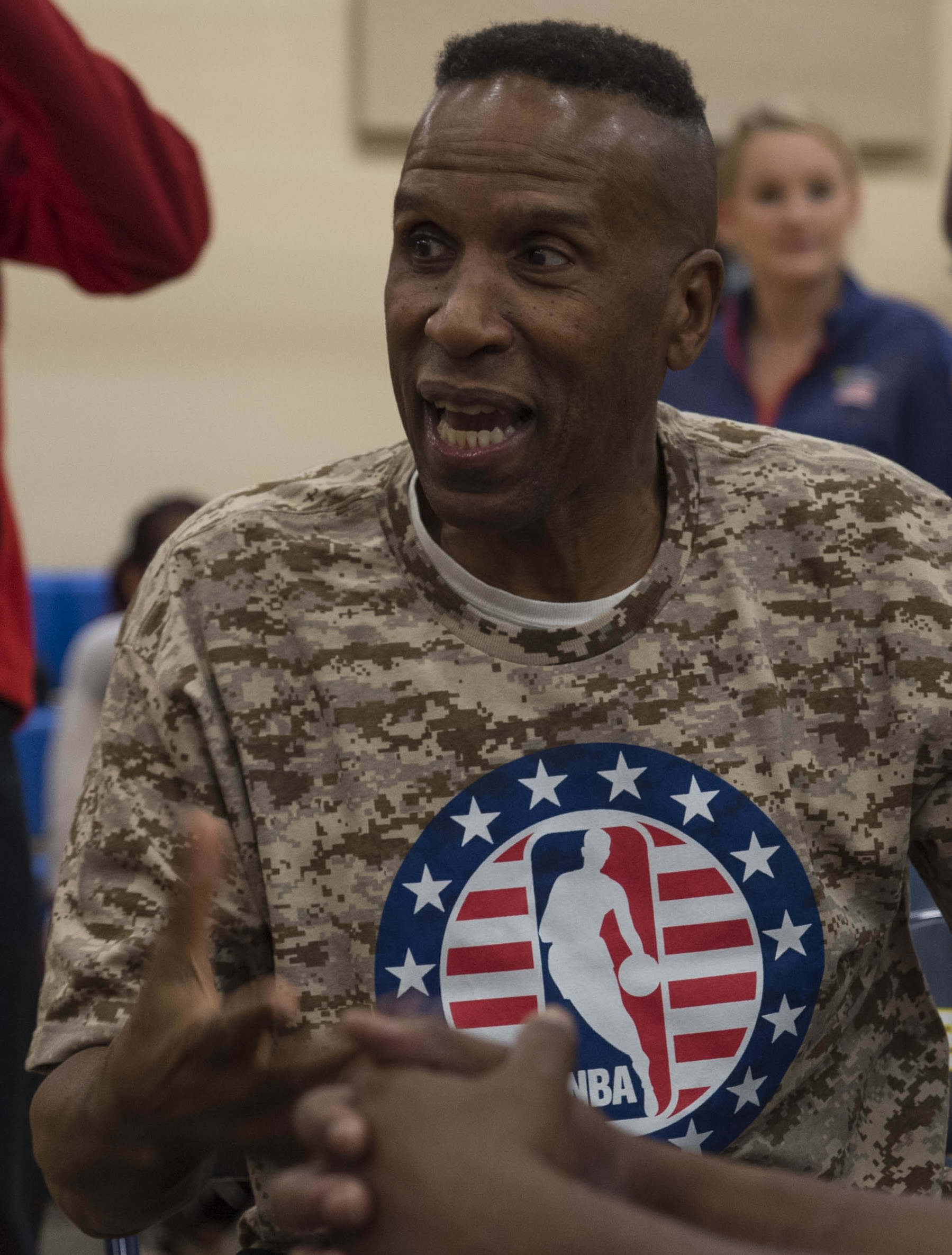
Adrian Dantley

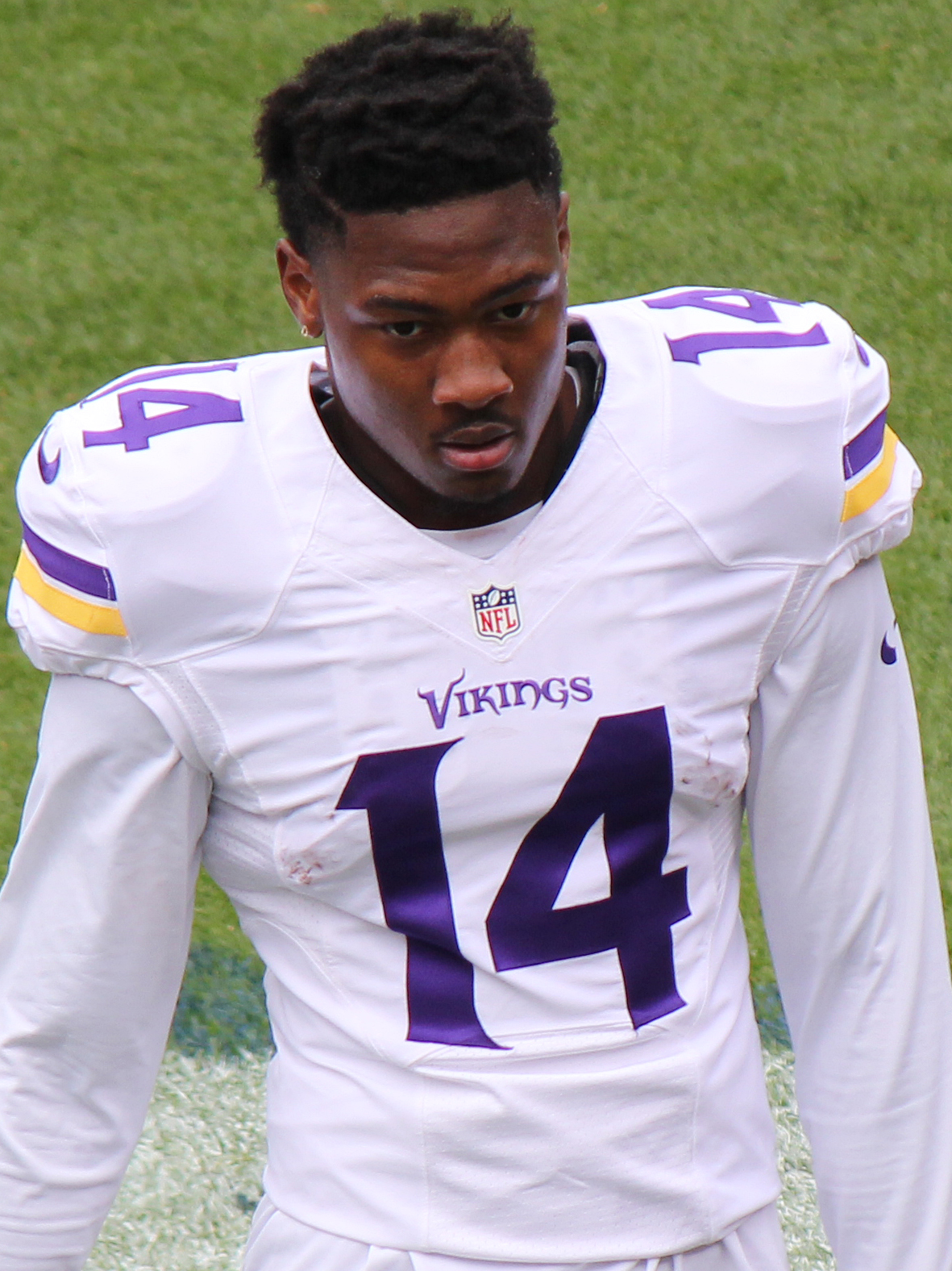
Stefon Diggs

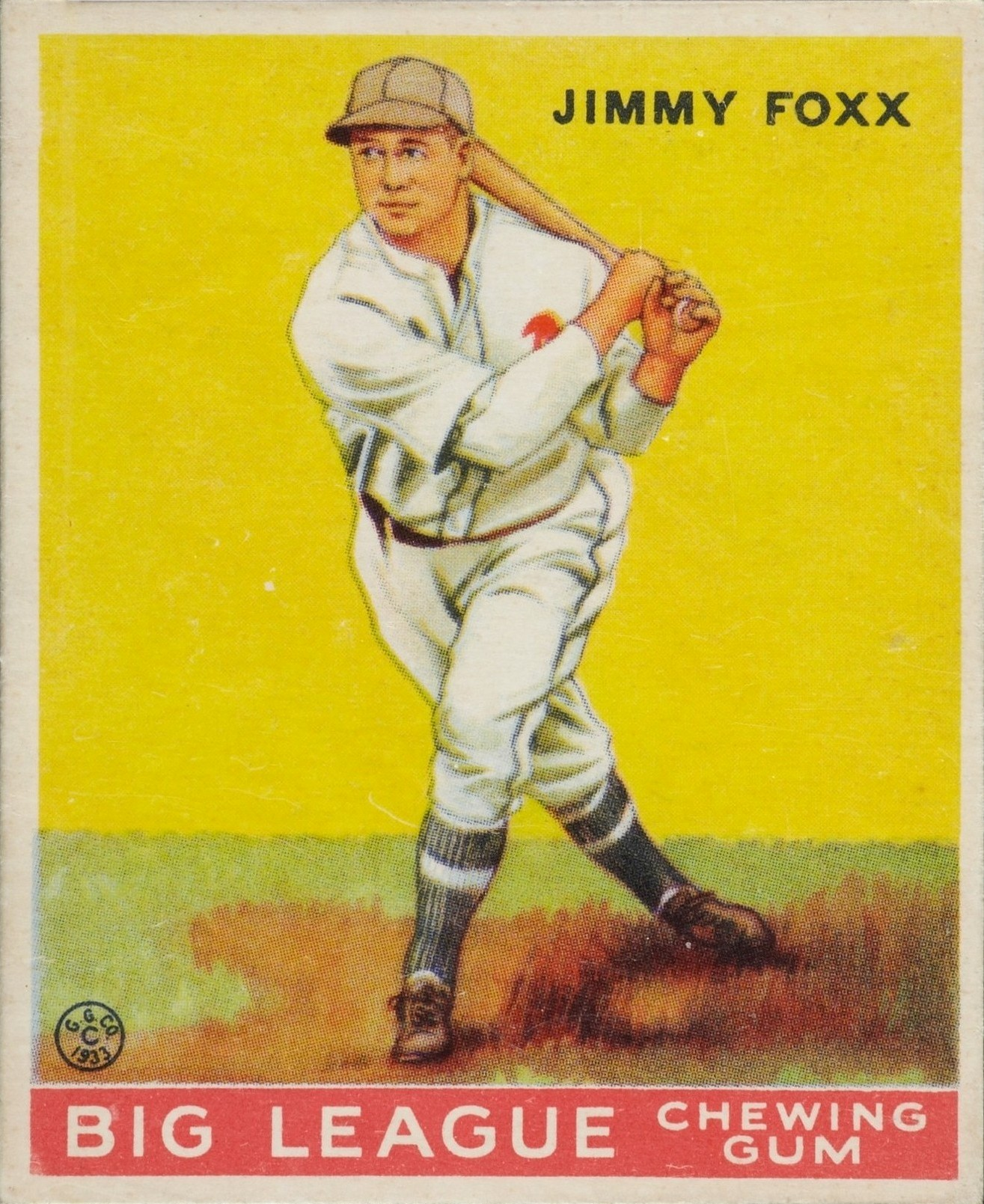
Jimmie Foxx

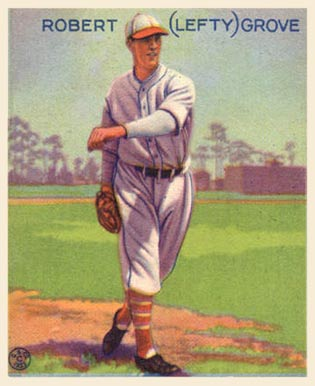
Lefty Grove

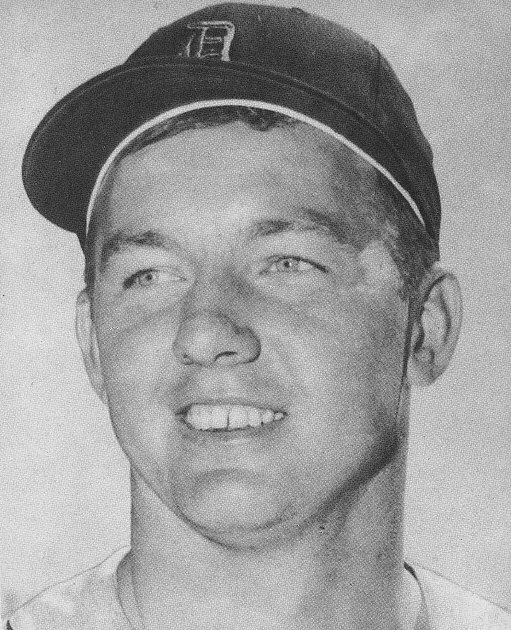
Al Kaline

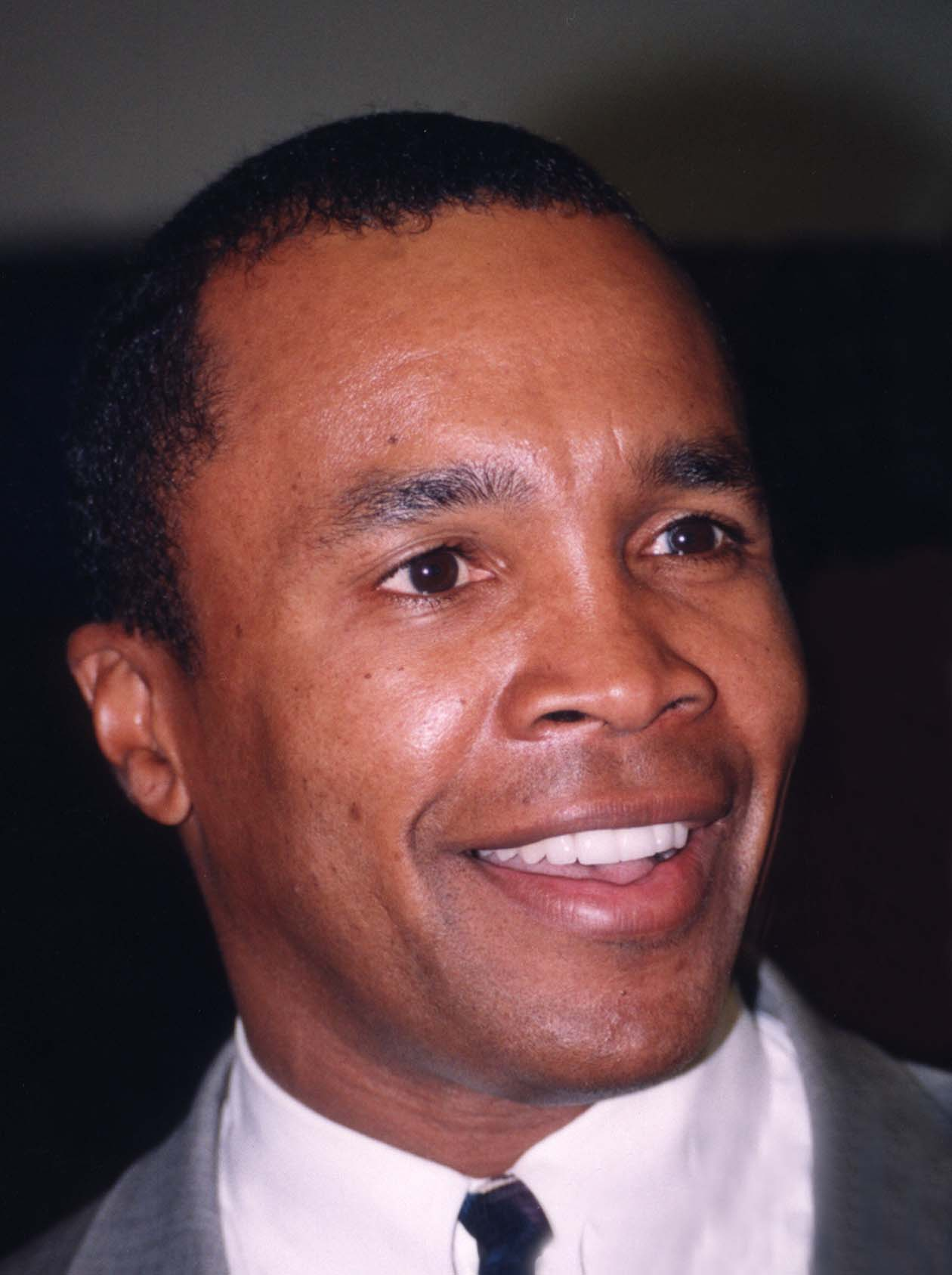
Sugar Ray Leonard

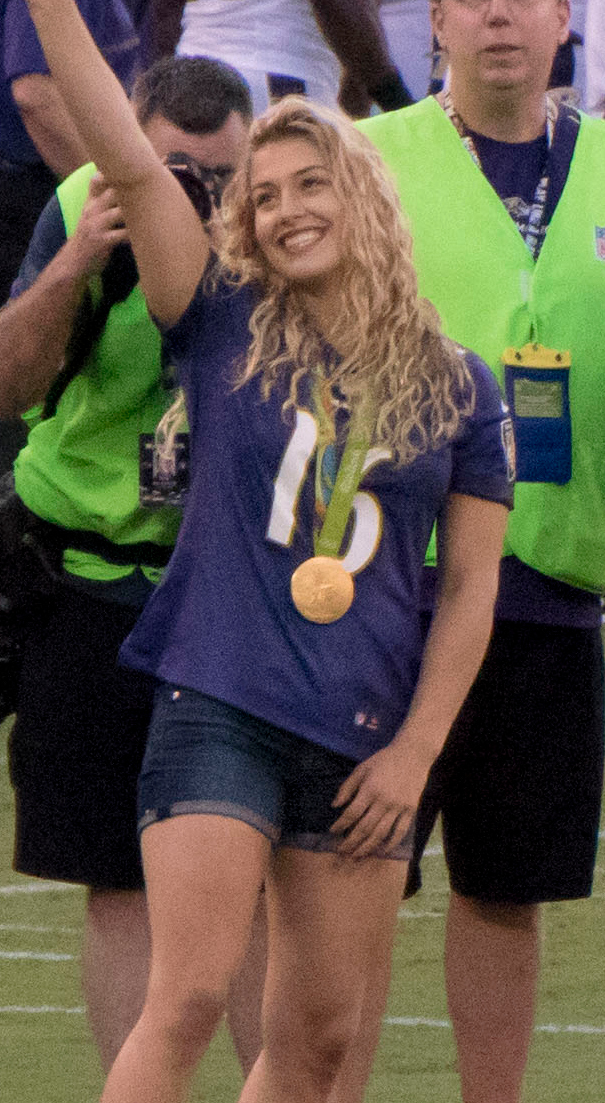
Helen Maroulis

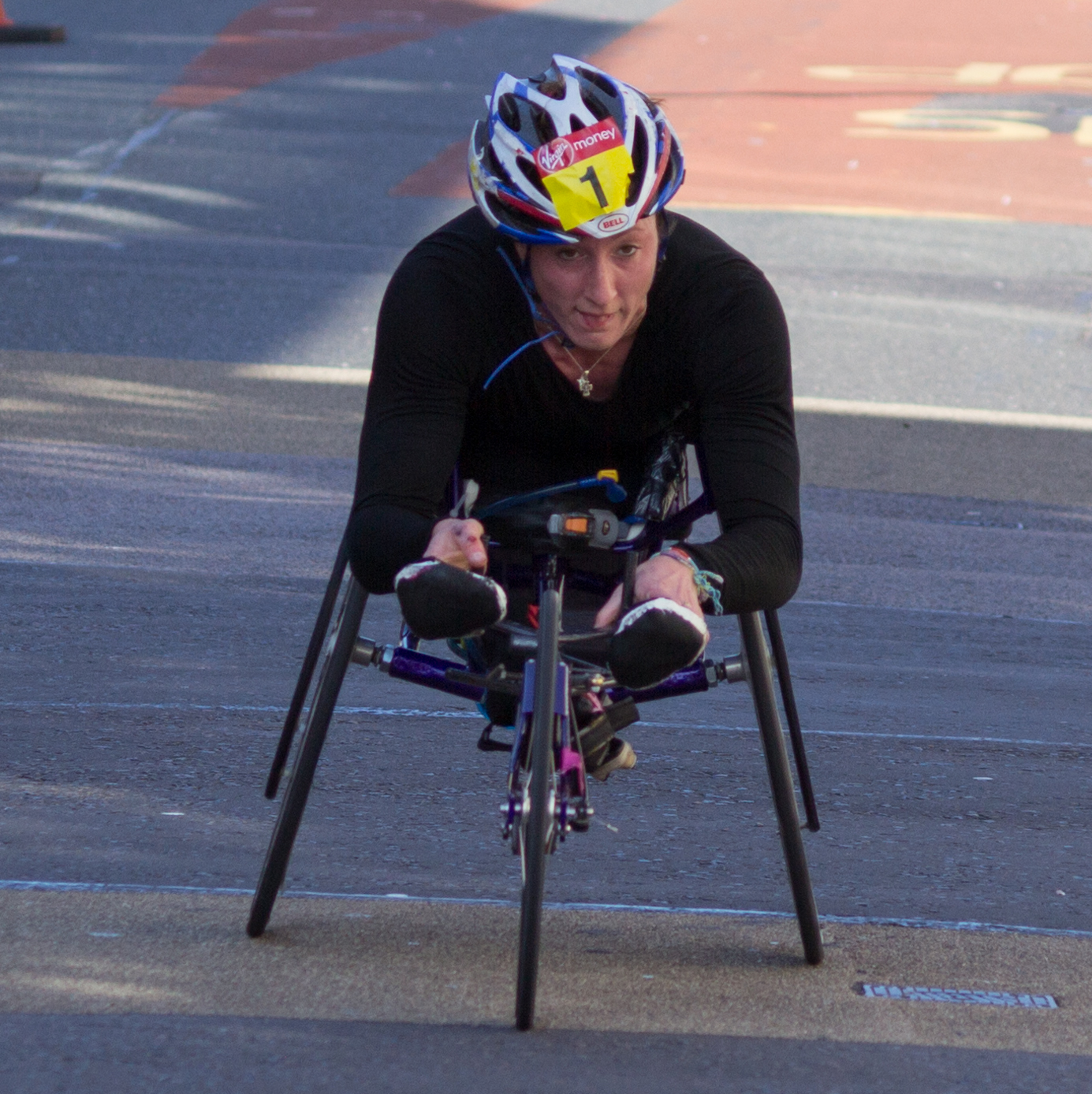
Tatyana McFadden

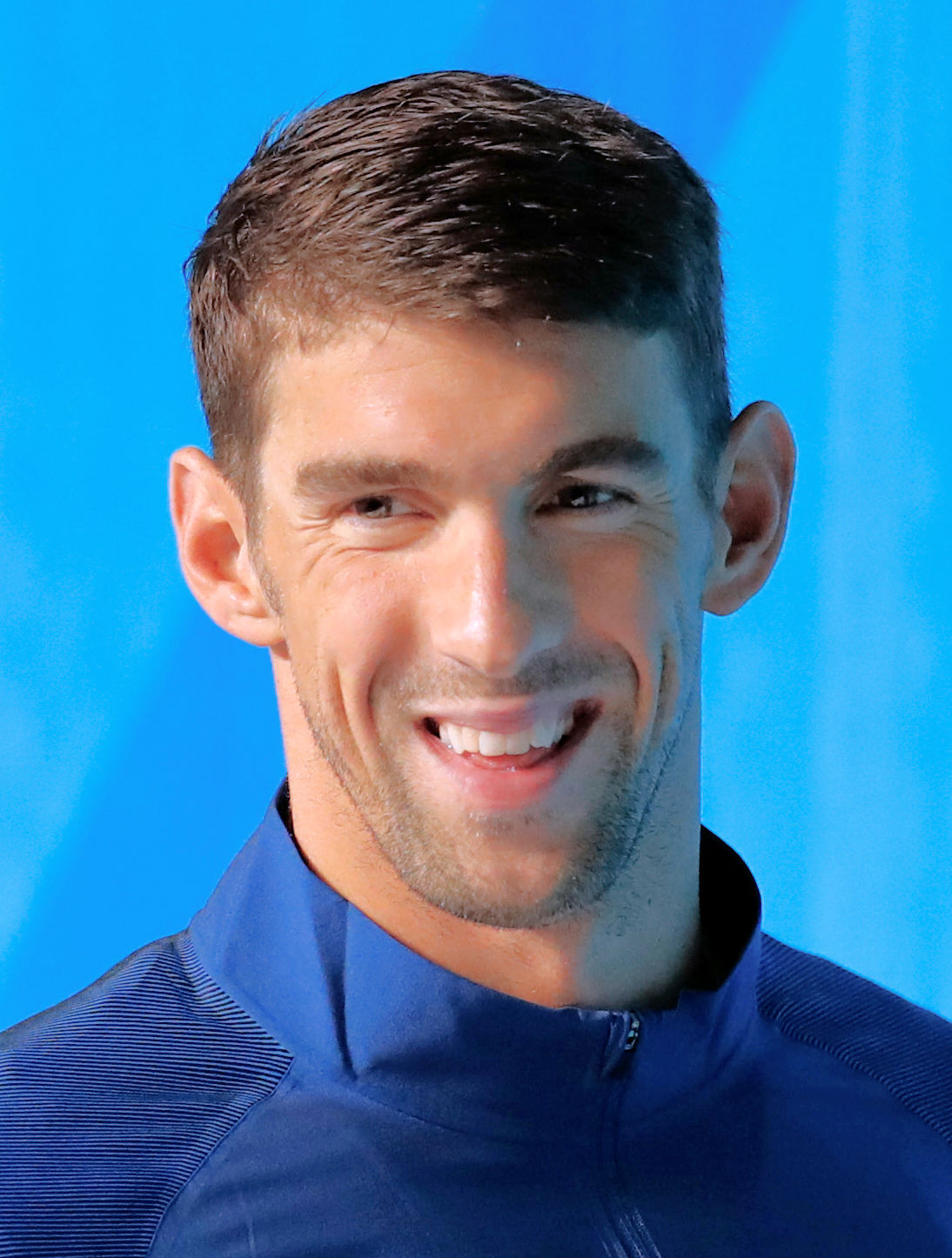
Michael Phelps

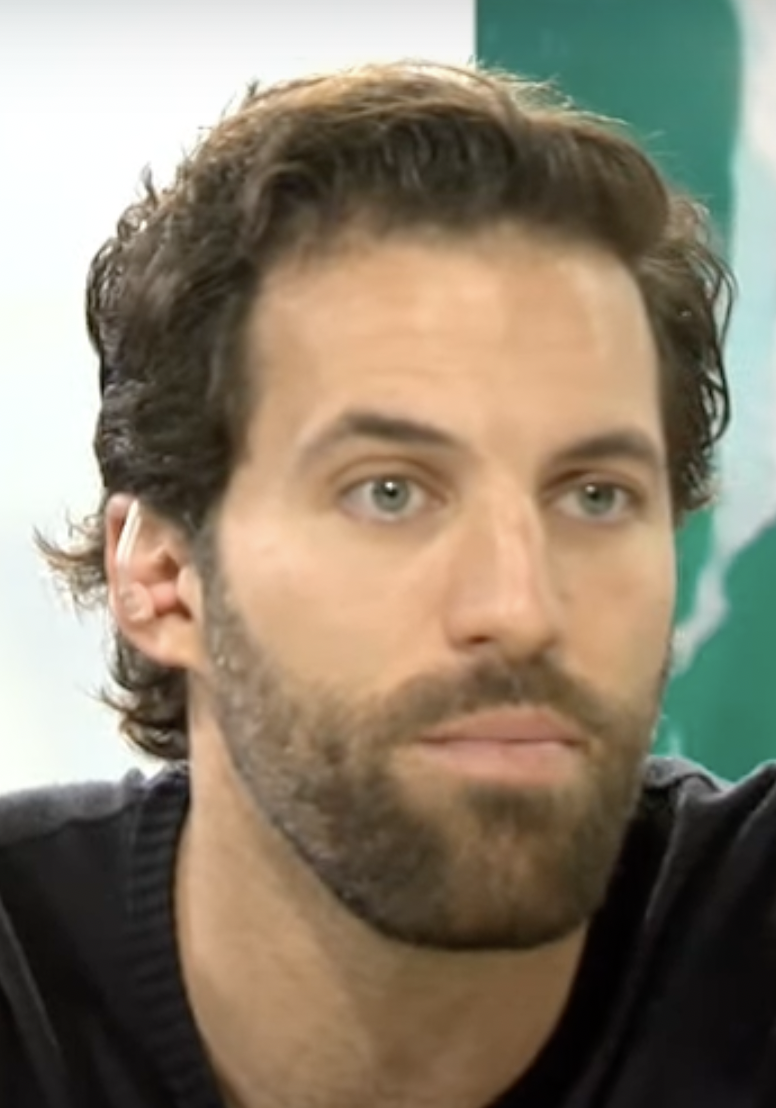
Paul Rabil

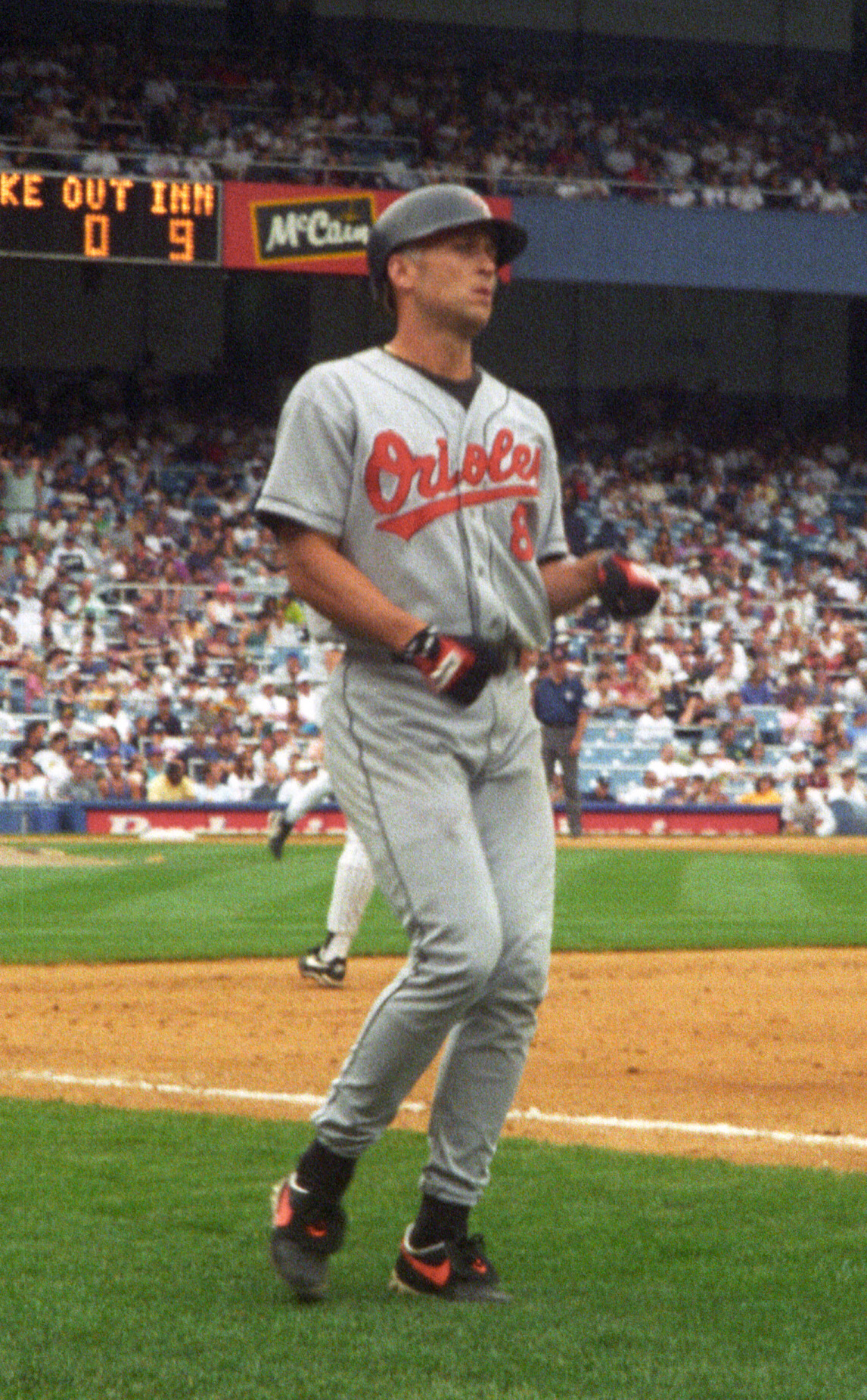
Cal Ripken Jr.

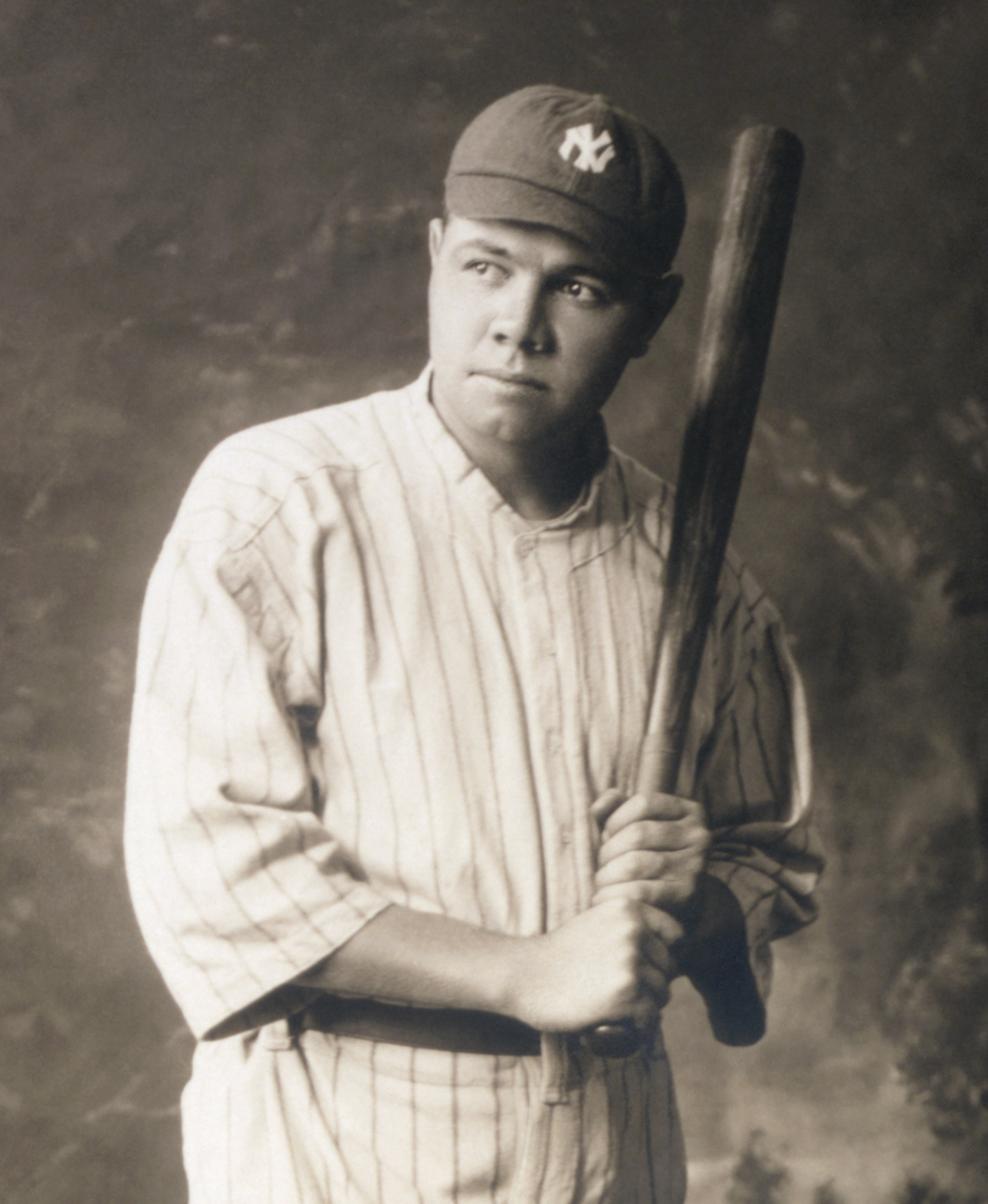
Babe Ruth

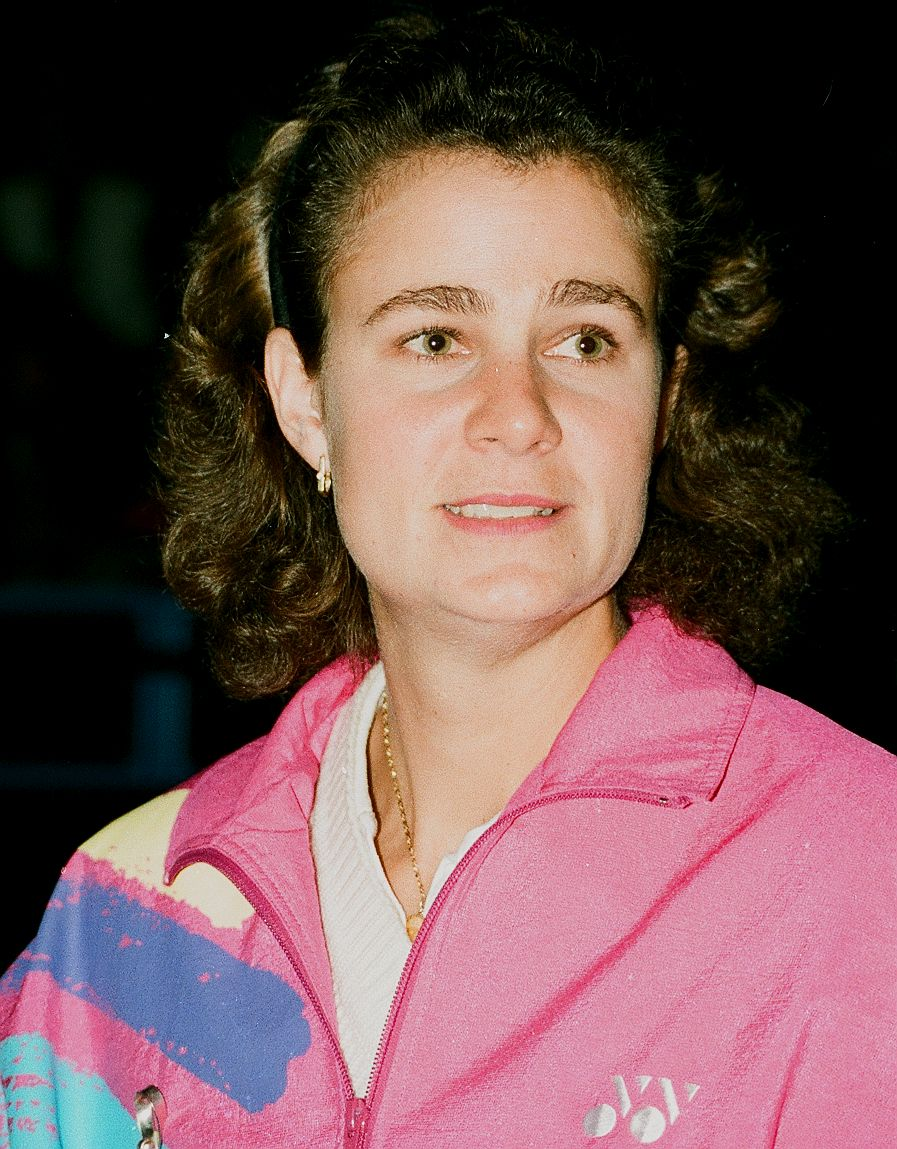
Pam Shriver

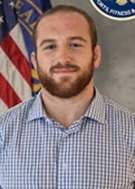
Kyle Snyder

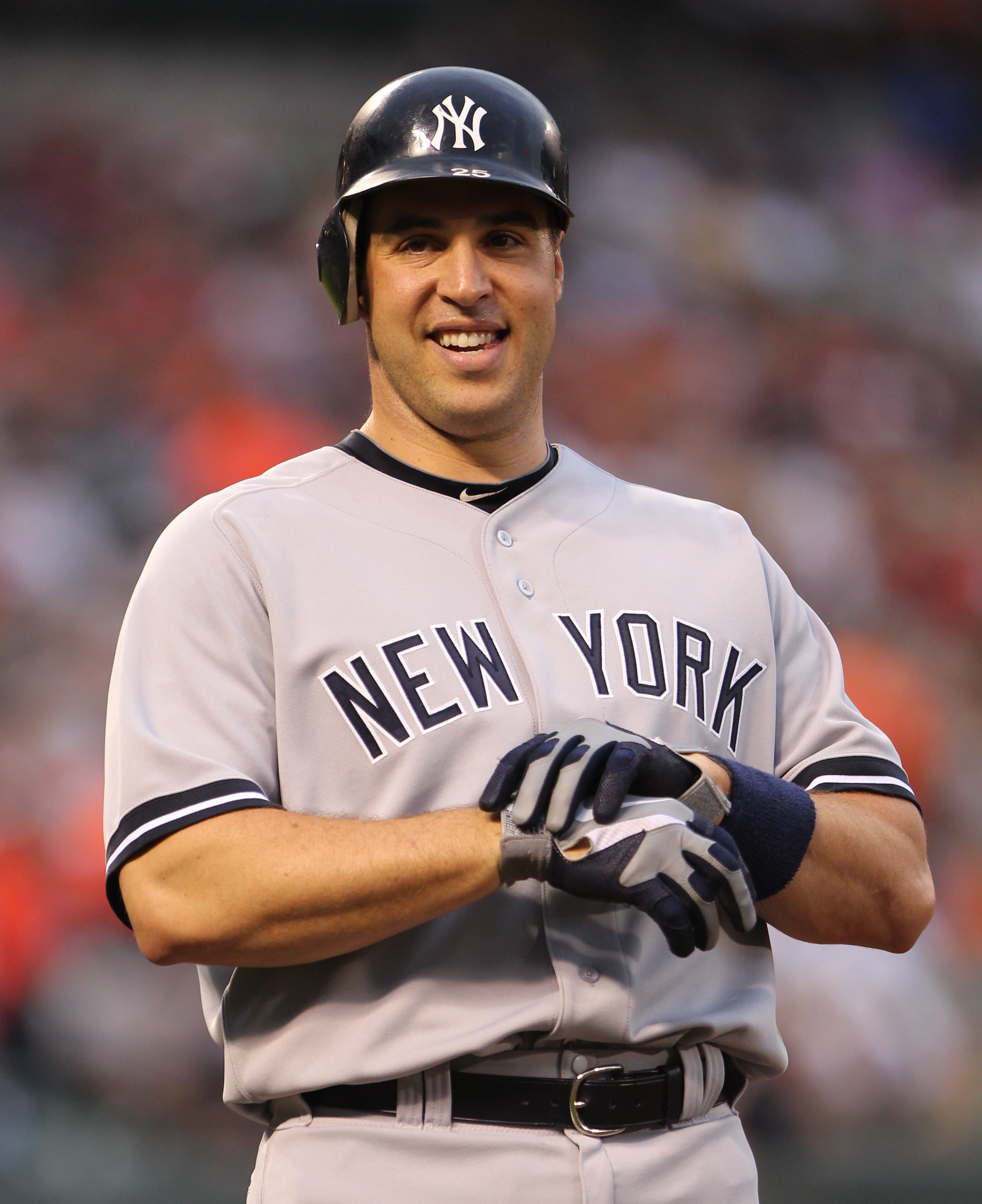
Mark Teixeira

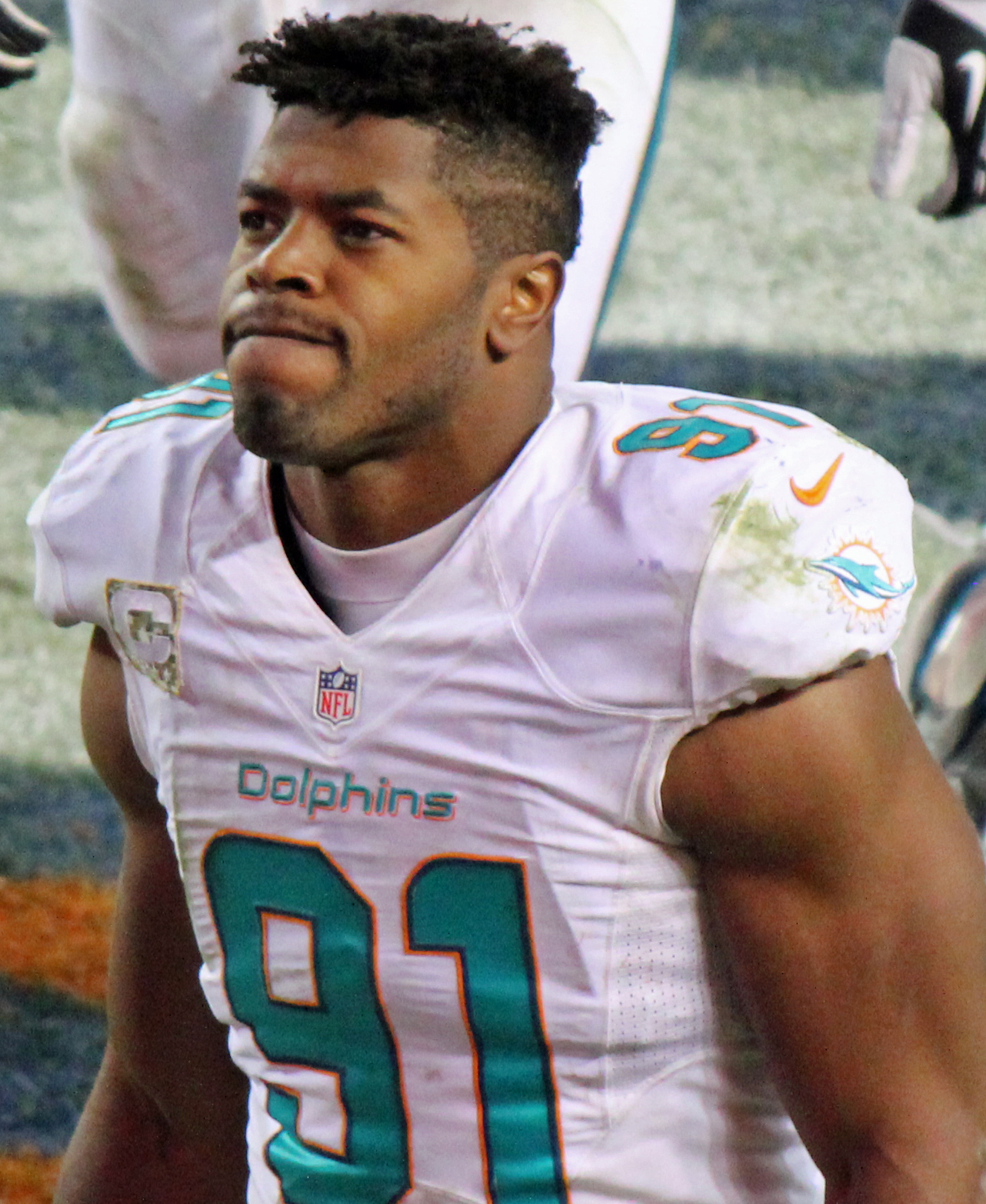
Cameron Wake

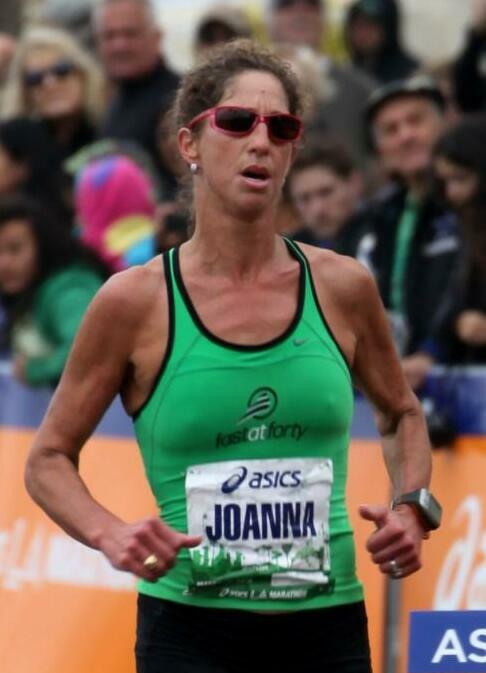
Joanna Zeiger

- Brendan Adams, basketball player
- Nick Adenhart, baseball player
- Joe Alexander, basketball player
- Brady Anderson, baseball player
- Justin Anderson, basketball player
- Carmelo Anthony, basketball player
- Lisa Aukland, professional bodybuilder and powerlifter
- Tavon Austin, football player
- Harold Baines, baseball player
- Frank Baker, baseball player
- Ken Bannister, basketball player
- Shaquil Barrett, football player
- Lonny Baxter, basketball player
- Steve Barber, baseball player
- Michael Beasley, basketball player
- Kyle Beckerman, soccer player
- Bill Belichick, football coach
- Len Bias, basketball player
- Keith Bogans, basketball player
- Tyrone "Muggsy" Bogues, basketball player
- Josh Boone, basketball player
- Riddick Bowe, heavyweight champion boxer
- Matt Bowman, baseball player
- NaVorro Bowman, football player
- Charles Bradley, basketball player
- Dudley Bradley, basketball player
- Troy Brohawn, baseball player
- Andre Brown, football player
- Elise Burgin, tennis player
- James Carter, hurdler
- Sam Cassell, basketball player
- Brett Cecil, baseball player
- Steve Clevenger, baseball player
- Colin Cloherty, football player
- Andy Cohen, baseball second baseman and coach
- Chris Coghlan, baseball player
- Brandon Coleman, football player
- Keandre Cook (born 1997), basketball player
- Jerome Couplin III, football player
- Dante Cunningham, basketball player
- Quintin Dailey, basketball player
- Adrian Dantley, basketball player
- Ronald Darby, football player
- Will Davis, football player
- Dominique Dawes, Olympic gymnast
- Delino DeShields Jr., baseball player
- Judy Devlin, badminton player
- Susan Devlin, badminton player
- Stefon Diggs, football player
- Juan Dixon, basketball player
- Joey Dorsey, basketball player
- John Dorsey, football player, general manager
- Pat Downey, freestyle wrestler
- Michael Dunn, football player
- Kevin Durant, basketball player
- Jerome Dyson, basketball player
- James Ellsworth, professional wrestler
- Eva Fabian, American-Israeli world champion swimmer
- Michel Faulkner, football player
- Duane Ferrell, basketball player
- Danny Ferry, basketball player
- Tony Fiammetta, football player
- Gavin Floyd, baseball player
- Moise Fokou, football player
- Domonique Foxworth, football player
- Jimmie Foxx, Hall of Fame baseball player
- Steve Francis, basketball player
- Corey Fuller, football player
- Kyle Fuller, football player
- Rudy Gay, basketball player
- James Gist, basketball player
- Paul Goldstein, tennis player
- Justin Gorham (born 1998), basketball player in the Israeli Basketball Premier League
- Brian Gottfried, World No. 3-ranked tennis player
- David Grace, basketball coach
- Jeff Green, basketball player
- Donté Greene, basketball player
- Gabe Gross, baseball player
- Lefty Grove, Hall of Fame baseball player
- Todd Gurley, football player
- Scott Hall, professional wrestler
- Jeff Halpern, hockey player
- Derrick Harvey, football player
- Marcus Hatten, basketball player
- Rob Havenstein, football player
- Darrius Heyward-Bey, football player
- Roy Hibbert, basketball player
- Calvin Hill, football player, father of Grant Hill
- Timmy Hill, NASCAR driver
- Tyler Hill, NASCAR driver
- Katie Hoff, swimmer
- Spencer Horwitz (born 1997), baseball player
- Jarrett Jack, basketball player
- Tanard Jackson, football player
- Tracy Jackson, basketball player
- Jelani Jenkins, football player
- Bryant Johnson, football player
- Larry Johnson, football player
- Steve Johnson, baseball player
- Cyrus Jones, football player
- Al Kaline, Hall of Fame baseball player
- Lloyd Keaser, Olympic freestyle wrestler
- Stacy Keibler, professional wrestler
- Charlie Keller, baseball player
- Stanton Kidd, basketball player in the Israeli Basketball Premier League
- Linas Kleiza, basketball player
- Rick Knapp, pitching coach
- Adam Kolarek, baseball player
- Cyrus Kouandjio, football player
- Steve Krulevitz, American-Israeli tennis player
- Aaron Laffey, baseball player
- Bucky Lasek, professional skateboarder
- Ty Lawson, basketball player
- Katie Ledecky, Olympic swimmer
- Ivan Leshinsky, American-Israeli basketball player
- Steve Lombardozzi Jr., baseball player
- Sugar Ray Leonard, Hall of Fame boxer
- Reggie Lewis, basketball player
- Sidney Lowe, basketball player, assistant coach
- Matt Maloney, basketball player
- Helen Maroulis, Olympic freestyle wrestler
- Roger Mason, basketball player
- Justin Maxwell, baseball player
- Leo Mazzone, baseball coach
- Robert McClain, football player
- Tatyana McFadden, paralympian category T54
- Rodney McLeod, football player
- Sara McMann, MMA fighter
- Kimmie Meissner, figure skater
- Shawne Merriman, football player
- Matt Mervis, MLB baseball first baseman
- Debbie Meyer, competition swimmer
- Abby Meyers, basketball player in the Women's National Basketball Association
- Isaiah Miles, basketball player in the Israeli Basketball Premier League
- Malcolm Miller, basketball player
- Terence Morris, basketball player
- Daniel Muir, football player
- Bruce Murray, soccer player
- Jeff Nelson, baseball player
- Rashard Odomes, basketball player in the Israeli Basketball Premier League
- Quinn Ojinnaka, football player
- Victor Oladipo, basketball player
- Chinanu Onuaku, basketball player
- Travis Pastrana, motorsport athlete
- Sam Perlozzo, baseball player and manager
- Julian Peterson, football player
- Michael Phelps, Olympic swimmer
- Tom Phoebus, baseball player
- Poe brothers, six American football players from Princeton University
- Oliver Purnell, basketball coach
- Paul Rabil, lacrosse player
- Mike Reid, professional golfer
- Billy Ripken, baseball player
- Cal Ripken Jr., Hall of Fame baseball player
- Bob Robertson, baseball player
- Josh Roenicke, baseball player
- Axl Rotten, professional wrestler
- Jake Rozhansky, American-Israeli professional soccer player
- Babe Ruth, Hall of Fame baseball player
- Jill Rutten, soccer player
- Pete Sampras, tennis player
- Jim Schwartz, football coach
- Dennis Scott, basketball player
- Josh Selby, basketball player
- Kevin Shaffer, football player
- Visanthe Shiancoe, football player
- Pam Shriver, tennis player
- Gene Shue, basketball player
- Lawrence Sidbury, football player
- Dickey Simpkins, basketball player
- Ira Smith, collegiate baseball player
- Tubby Smith, basketball coach
- Kyle Snyder, Olympic freestyle wrestler
- Harold Solomon, tennis player
- Larry Spriggs, basketball player
- Mike Sweetney, basketball player
- Ron Swoboda, baseball player
- Frances Tiafoe, tennis player
- Mark Teixeira, baseball player
- Greivis Vásquez, basketball player
- Cameron Wake, football player
- Shatori Walker-Kimbrough (born 1995), basketball player for the Israeli team Maccabi Bnot Ashdod, and the Washington Mystics of the Women's National Basketball Association
- Marvin Webster, basketball player
- Delonte West, basketball player
- Brian Westbrook, football player
- Byron Westbrook, football player
- Greg Whittington, basketball player
- Derrick Williams, football player
- LaQuan Williams, football player
- Madieu Williams, football player
- Reggie Williams, basketball player
- Kennard Winchester, basketball player
- David Wingate, basketball player
- Danny Wiseman, Hall of Fame bowler
- Jay Witasick, baseball player
- Chase Young, football player
- Sam Young, basketball player
- Usama Young, football player
- Joanna Zeiger, Olympic and world champion triathlete, and author

== Visual artists ==
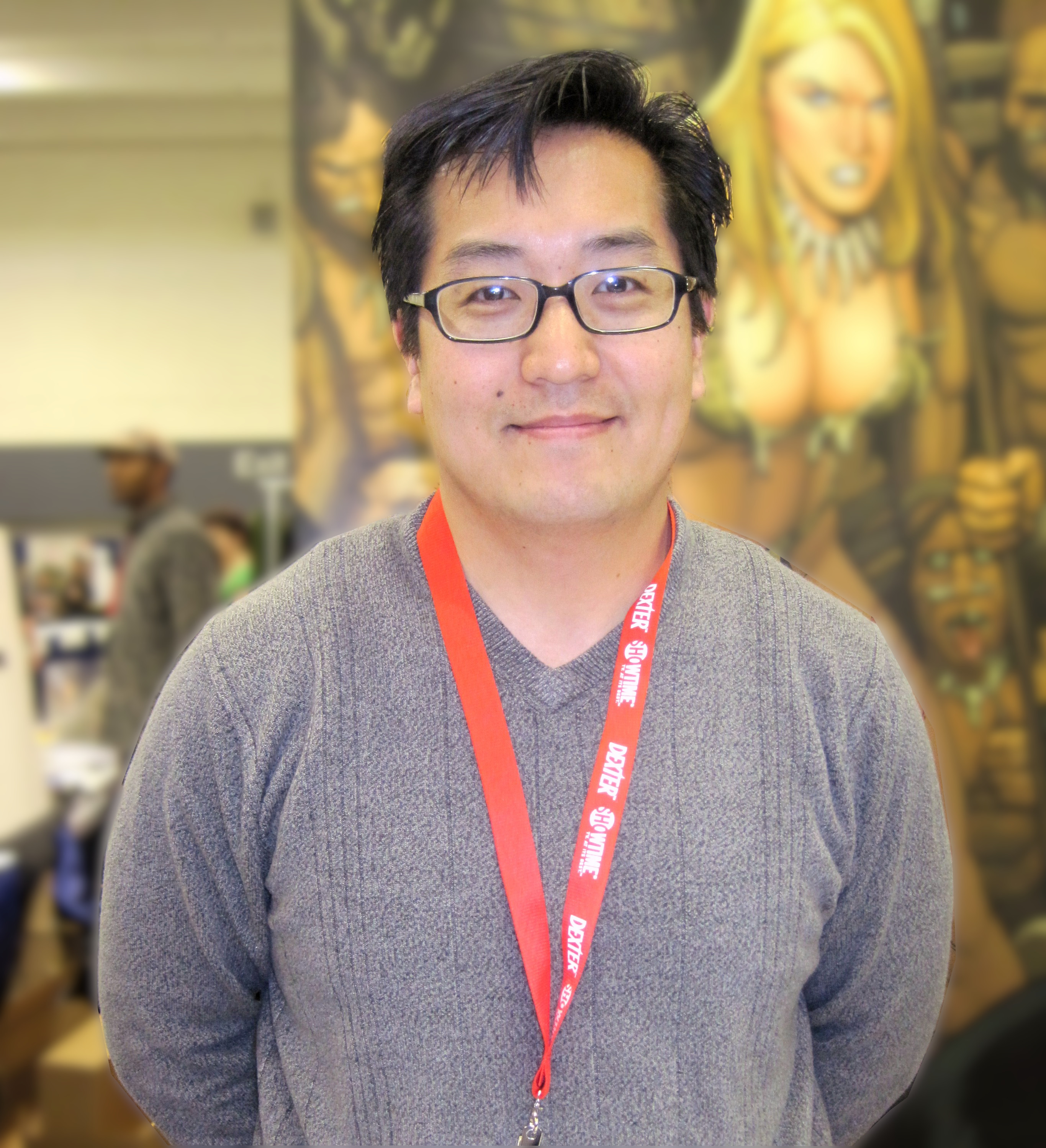
Frank Cho

- Rushern Baker IV (born 1987), painter, educator, politician
- Seiko Kato Behr (1941–2010), Japanese-born potter, ceramicist, ikebana floral designer, installation artist
- Chrystelle Trump Bond (1938–2020), dancer, choreographer, and dance historian
- F. Lennox Campello, visual artist, art critic, author, blogger
- Norman Carlberg (1928–2018), sculptor
- Anne Cherubim, painter
- Frank Cho (born 1971), comic book creator, writer and artist
- Joseph Craig English, printmaker
- Jane Frank (1918–1986), painter, sculptor, mixed media artist, illustrator
- Jason Freeny (born 1970), sculptor, toy designer, designer toy artist
- Lee Gatch, painter, mixed media artist
- Dick Hafer, cartoonist and comics creator
- Elaine Hamilton-O'Neal (1920–2010), painter
- Joseph Holston, painter and printmaker
- Wayson R. Jones, painter
- Andrei Kushnir, painter
- Rick Law, illustrator and film producer
- Morris Louis (1912–1962), painter
- Claire McCardell (1905–1958), fashion designer
- Joe Shannon (born 1937), painter, curator and educator
- Amy Sherald (born 1973), painter, portrait artist
- Anne Truitt (1921–2004), sculptor
- Diane Tuckman (1935–2024), painter and author
- Bernie Wrightson (1948–2017), comic book artist

== Individuals of historic significance ==
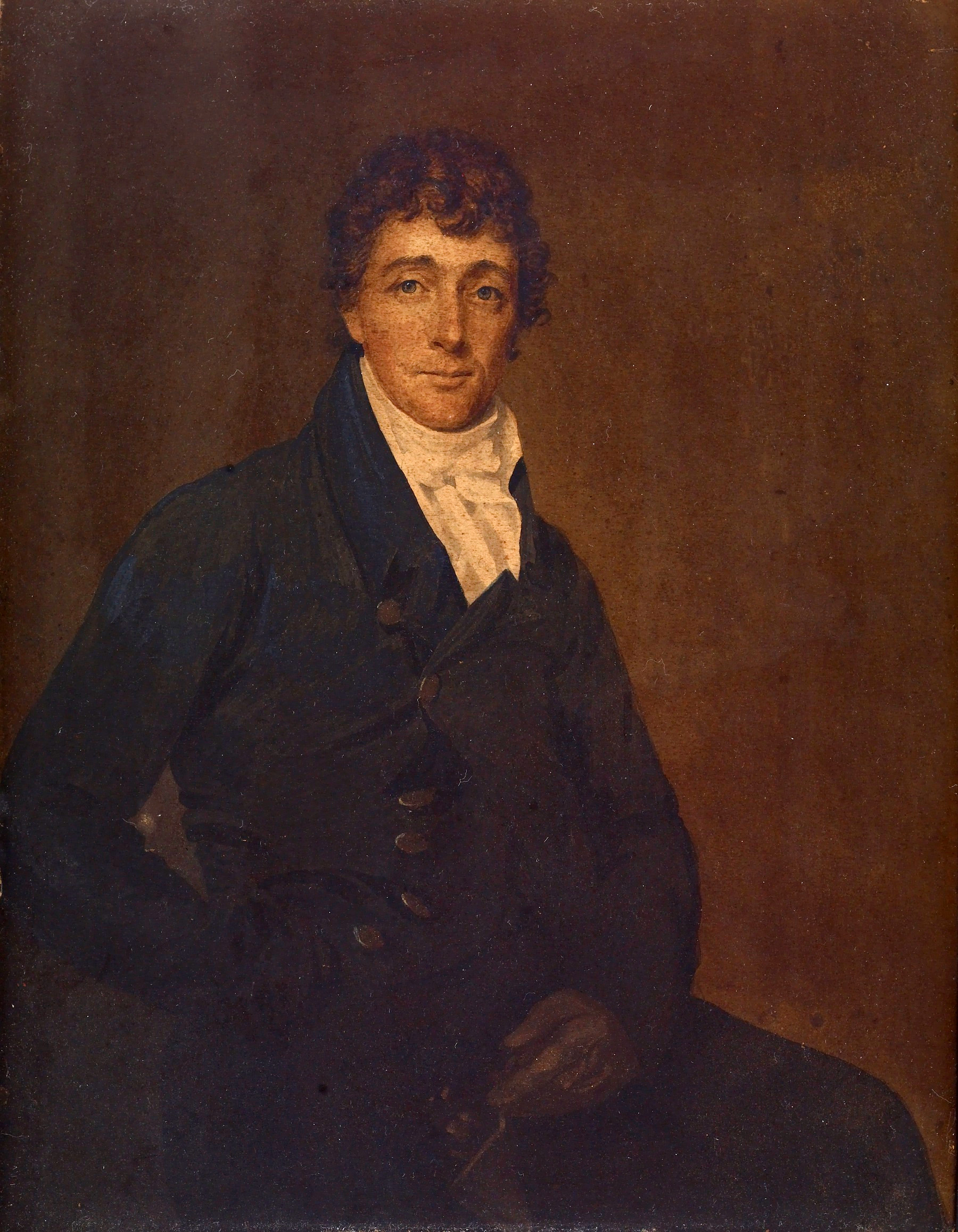
Francis Scott Key

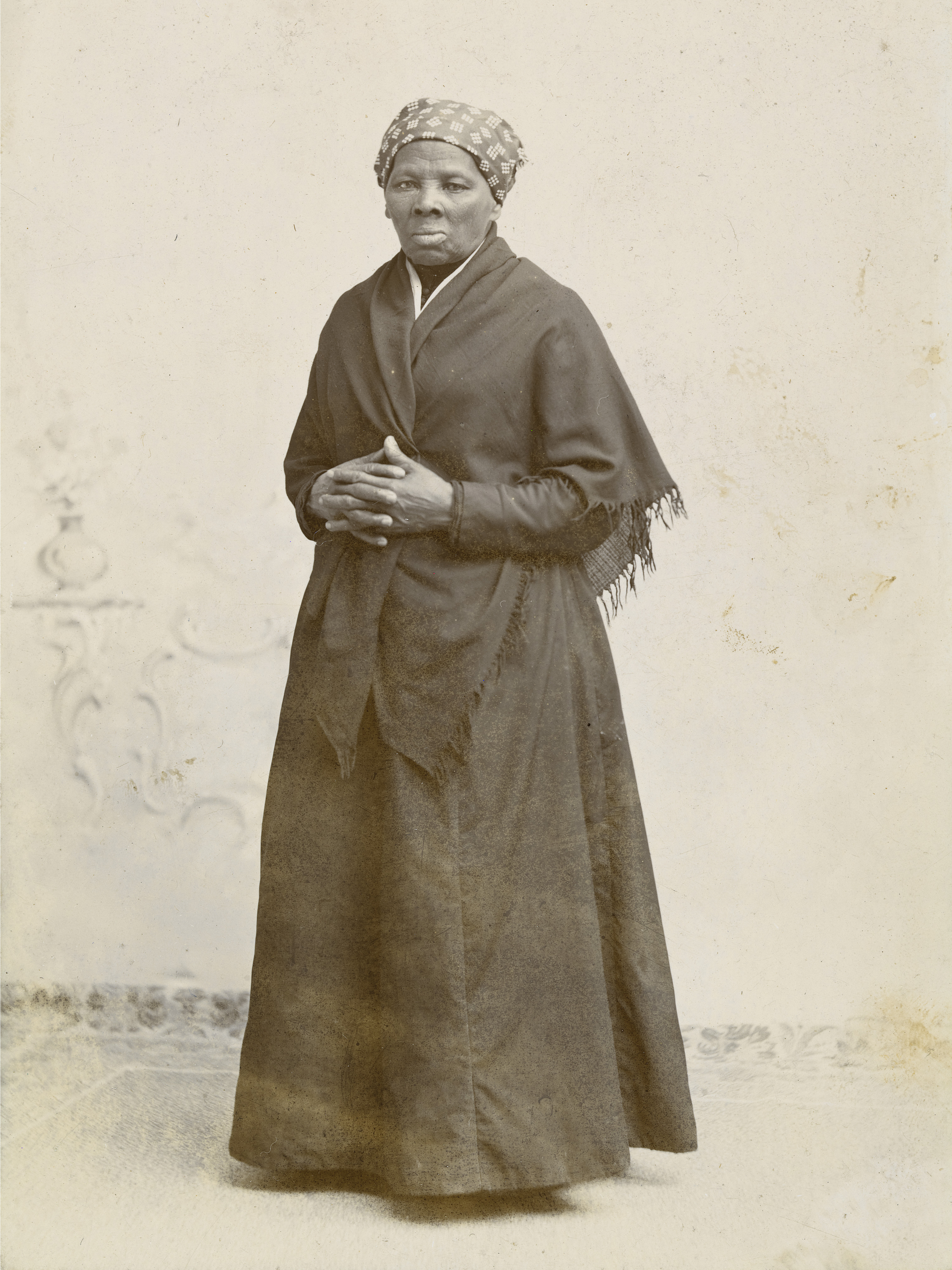
Harriet Tubman

- John Wilkes Booth, assassin of President Abraham Lincoln
- Cecil Calvert, 2nd Baron Baltimore, first proprietary governor of the Maryland Colony
- John Carroll, first Roman Catholic archbishop in the US
- Henry De Butts, 18th-century U.S. Army officer, acting adjutant general and inspector general
- Stephen Decatur, naval hero of the War of 1812
- Julia Dorsey, African-American suffragist
- William Hemsley Emory, U.S. Army officer and surveyor of Texas
- Matthew Henson, Arctic explorer
- Alger Hiss, UN official accused of being a Soviet spy in 1948, convicted of perjury in 1950
- Francis Scott Key, composer of "The Star-Spangled Banner", the poem used for the United States national anthem
- Jacob Lumbrozo, first Jew to permanently settle in the New World
- Charles A. May, U.S. Army cavalry officer, considered a hero of the Mexican War
- Samuel Mudd, physician convicted and imprisoned for aiding John Wilkes Booth
- Cadwalader Ringgold, U.S. Navy officer during the Civil War, explorer
- Edward Rowny, U.S. Army lieutenant general, World War II and Korean War veteran
- Raymond A. Spruance, admiral during World War II, ambassador to the Philippines
- Harriet Tubman, leader of the Underground Railroad

== Miscellaneous ==
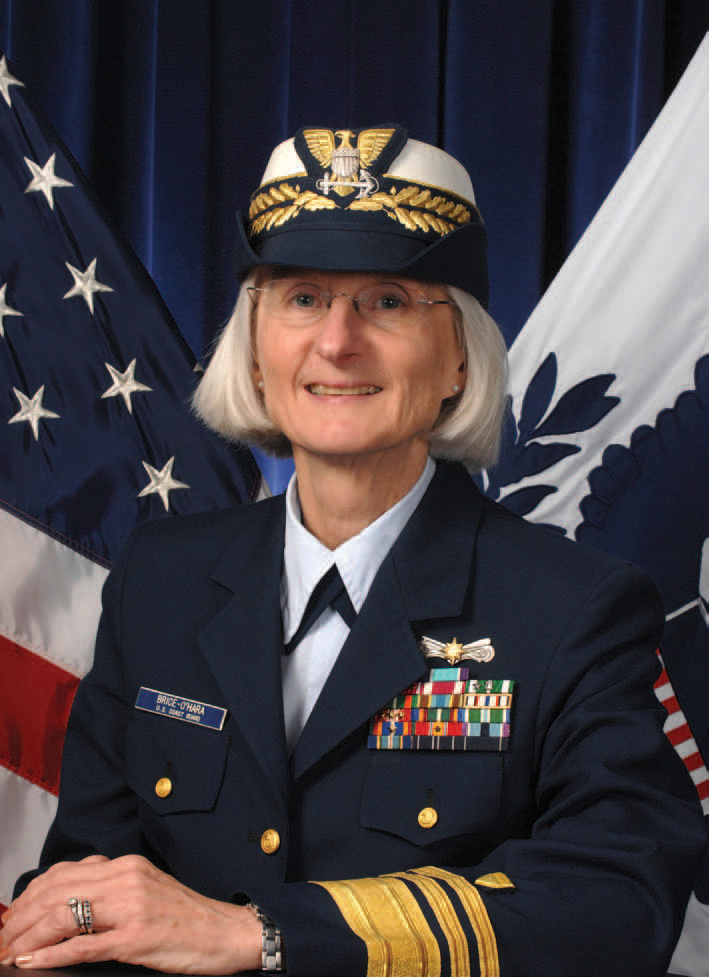
Sally Brice-O'Hara

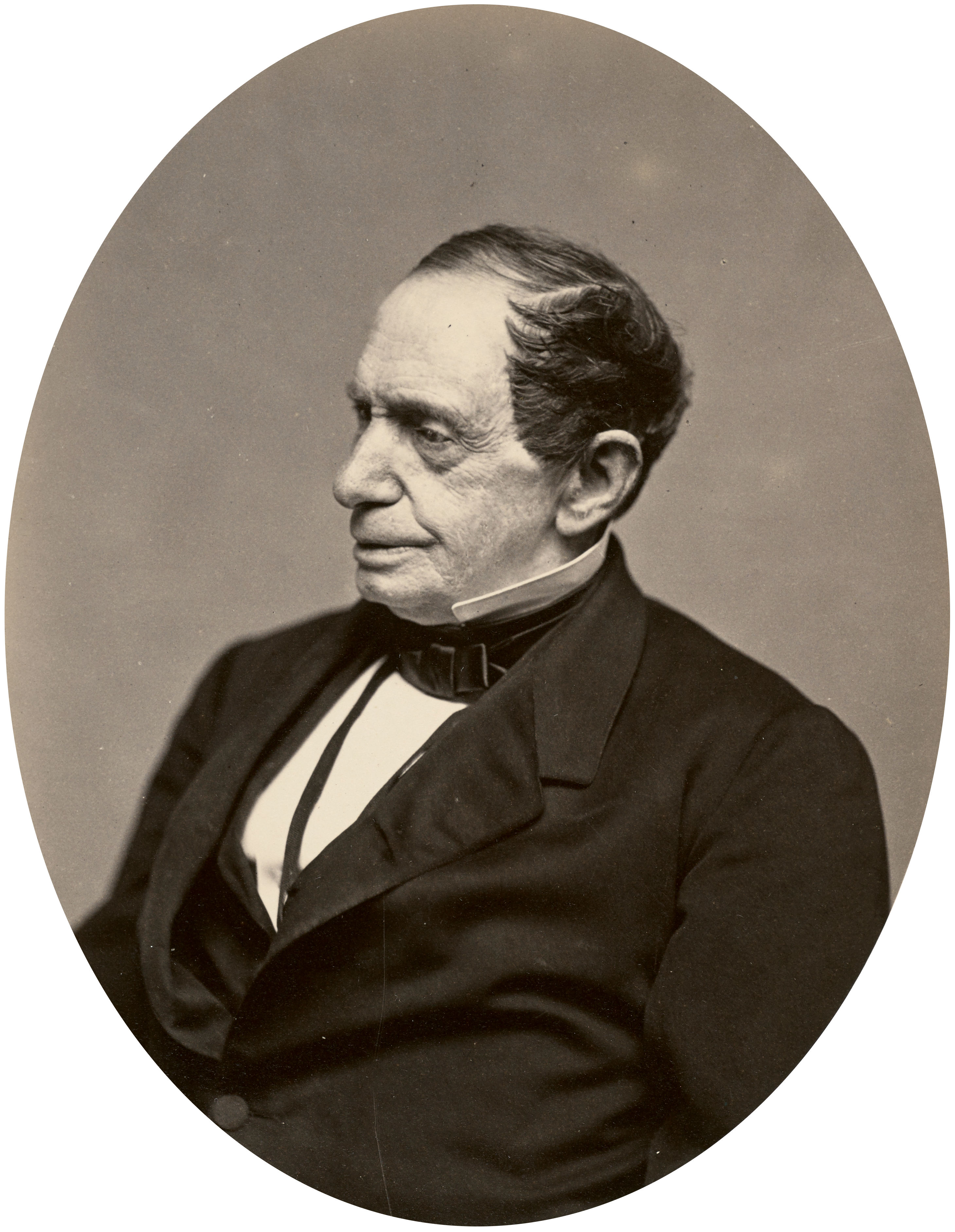
Johns Hopkins

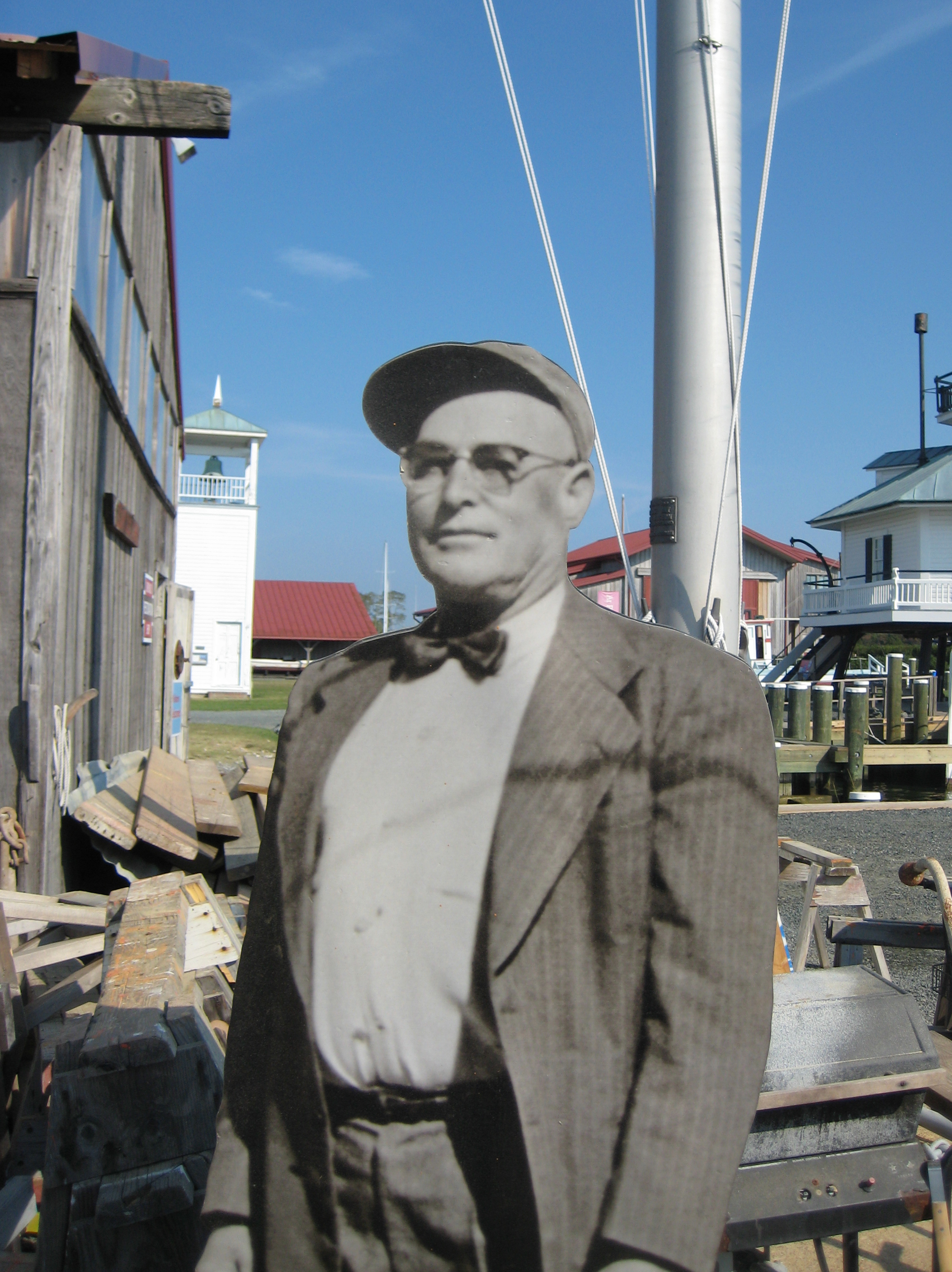
Bronza Parks

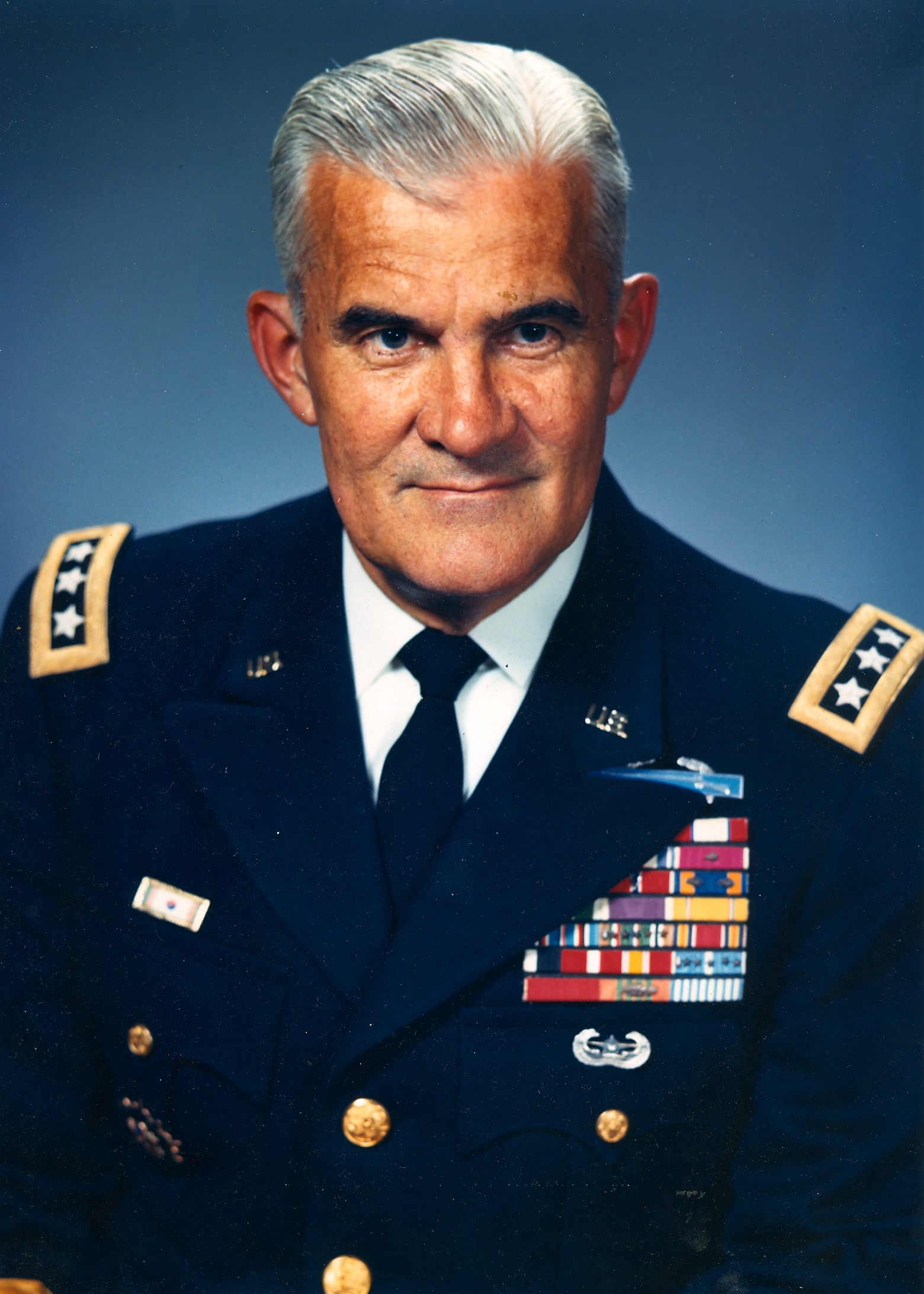
William Wilson Quinn

- Yosef Alon, Israeli Air Force officer and military attache
- Steve Bisciotti, majority owner of the Baltimore Ravens
- José Antonio Bowen, president of Goucher College
- Sally Brice-O'Hara, 27th vice-commandant of the U.S. Coast Guard
- Sally Buck, part-owner of the Philadelphia Phillies
- Blac Chyna, model, socialite and rapper
- Sherry Cooper, chief economist for Dominion Lending Centres; executive VP and chief economist of BMO Financial Group
- A. B. Cosey, writer, politician, recorder of deeds, and lawyer
- Timothy Creamer, NASA astronaut, U.S. Army Colonel
- Bud Delp, 1979 Kentucky Derby-winning trainer of Spectacular Bid
- Rhoda Dorsey, historian and first woman president of Goucher College
- Michel Faulkner, pastor and NYC politician
- Duff Goldman, owner of Charm City Cakes, star of Ace of Cakes
- Michael Hardt, literary theorist and political philosopher
- Arlo Hemphill, wilderness advocate
- Johns Hopkins, businessman and philanthropist
- Brendan Iribe, game programmer and co-founder of Oculus VR
- Edwin R. Keedy, Dean of the University of Pennsylvania Law School
- Mel Kiper Jr., ESPN football analyst, known for draft coverage
- Seth Klarman, billionaire, founder of The Baupost Group
- Little Albert, subject of John B. Watson's controversial case study on classical conditioning
- Luigi Mangione, alleged assassin of Brian Thompson
- Joseph Maskell (1939–2001), Catholic priest accused of sexual abuse
- Derrick Miller, paroled former US Army National Guard sergeant sentenced to life in prison for murder
- Peter Navarro, director of the National Trade Council under President Trump
- Creig Northrop, real estate agent, broker, and CEO of Northrop Realty
- Samuel J. Palmisano, president and CEO of IBM
- Bronza Parks, boatbuilder
- Bob Parsons, CEO and founder of Go Daddy
- George Peabody, founder of the Peabody Institute, philanthropist
- Frank Perdue, president of Perdue Farms
- Kevin Plank, CEO and founder of Under Armour
- Virginia Eliza Clemm Poe, wife of writer Edgar Allan Poe
- Hortense Powdermaker, anthropologist
- Kenneth Preston, US Army soldier who served as the sergeant major of the Army
- William Wilson Quinn, former US Army officer
- John Rawls, philosopher
- Hilary Rhoda, model
- Jim Rogers, businessman, investor, author
- James Rouse, city planner
- Elizabeth Lownes Rust, philanthropist, humanitarian, missionary
- Ida Mary Barry Ryan, philanthropist
- Bradford Shellhammer, entrepreneur and designer, founding editor of Queerty
- Christian Siriano, winner of Season 4 of Project Runway
- Daniel Snyder, owner of the Washington Commanders
- Ben Stein, actor, author, economist, political speechwriter
- Robert Stethem, U.S. Navy Seabee diver killed by Hezbollah militants during the hijacking of TWA Flight 847
- Matthew VanDyke, freedom fighter and prisoner of war (POW) in the 2011 Libyan Civil War
- Bill White, neo-Nazi and former leader of the American National Socialist Workers' Party
- Paula White, international Christian evangelist and teacher
- Meredith Whitney (born 1969), businesswoman
- Bill Wilson, head of Americans for Limited Government
- Leo Wolman, economist
- George Young, NFL executive

== See also ==
- Lists of Americans
- List of Maryland suffragists
