= Eli (name) =

- Pronunciation: English: /ˈiːlaɪ/ Hebrew: [ˈeli] Danish: [ˈe̝ːli]
- Gender: Male
- Language: Hebrew, English, Norwegian, Danish, Spanish

Origin
- Origin: Biblical עֵלִי
- Meaning: ascent; my God

Other names
- Related names: Ilya, Ali, Elijah, Ilyas, Elias, Elisha, Eliezer, Elimelech

Eli as a name has two different meanings, both originating in the Hebrew Bible.

Eli can be used for males (Hebrew tradition) or females (Scandinavian tradition). Hebrew origin, from Biblical עֵלִי "ascent", spelled with the Hebrew letter ayin in the beginning, the name of Eli, the high priest in the Books of Samuel. It is identical to the Arabic name Ali (علي). It came to be used as a given name among the Puritans in the 17th century and was by them taken to the American colonies.

Eli may alternatively be an unrelated abbreviation of Hebrew names such as Elijah, Elias, Elisha, Eliezer, Elimelech, etc., all containing the element אלי, meaning "my God" and spelled with the Hebrew letter aleph in the beginning. El is the name of a Semitic deity that is used in the Bible as a name for the god of the Israelites, and -i is the suffix for the genitive form ("mine").

In the United States, the popularity of the given name Eli was hovering around rank 200 in the 1880s. It declined gradually during the late 19th and early-to-mid 20th centuries, falling below rank 700 in 1964. In a significant revival of the name's popularity in the early 1970s, it bounced back above rank 400 in 1976. Its popularity has continued to grow since then, entering the top 100 masculine given names in the 2000s, and ranking as the 64th most popular boys' name as of 2021.

Eli is also a short form of names Elisabet, Elin, and Helena in Scandinavia, unrelated to the masculine Hebrew name Eli. The two names differ in pronunciation as well.

== Given name ==
=== Male ===
- Eli Abaev (born 1998), American-Israeli basketball player
- Eli Abarbanel (born 1976), Israeli retired footballer
- Eli Abbott (1869–1943), American college football player, and college football- and baseball coach
- Eli Adams (born 2002), Australian professional soccer player
- Eli Adashi (born 1945), American-Israeli physician, scientist, and professor
- Eli Aflalo (born 1952), Israeli politician
- Eli Alaluf (1945–2026), Israeli politician
- Eli Almi (1892–1963), Polish-born Jewish-American poet, journalist, essayist, and mystic
- Eli Alon (born 1945), Israeli physician and anesthesiologist
- Eli Alva Helmick (1863–1945), American Army officer
- Eli Amir (born 1937), Iraqi-born Israeli writer, civil servant, and peace activist
- Eli Ankou (born 1994), Canadian professional football player
- Eli Apple (born 1995), American NFL player
- Eli Arenson (born 1988), Israeli cinematographer
- Eli Ashurst (1901–1927), English professional footballer
- Eli Attie, American writer, producer, and former White House staff member
- Eli Avidar (born 1964), Israeli former politician
- Eli Avramov (?–2015), Israeli past member of new wave band HaClique
- Eli Ayers (1778–1822), American-born Liberian medical doctor and governor
- Eli Azur (born 1958), Israeli businessman
- Eli B. Ames (1820–1898), American lawyer, postmaster, judge, and mayor
- Eli Babalj (born 1992), Bosnian-born Australian footballer
- Eli Baker (born 2001), American actor
- Eli Balas, Israeli professional poker player
- Eli Balilty (born 1994), Israeli footballer
- Eli Baptist (1820–1905), American abolitionist
- Eli Barkai, Israeli Jewish professor of physics
- Eli Barnes, African-American slave-turned politician
- Eli Baruch Shulman (born 1959), American Orthodox Jewish rabbi
- Eli Batalion, Canadian actor
- Eli Bauer (1928–1998), American animation layout- and story man, and comics artist
- Eli Baxter (born 1954), Canadian writer
- Eli Bebout (born 1946), American athlete and politician
- Eli Beeding (1928–2013), American Air Force captain and rocket test subject
- Eli Beer (born 1973), Israeli social entrepreneur and emergency medical services innovator
- Eli Ben-Dahan (born 1954), Israeli Orthodox Jewish rabbi and politician
- Eli Ben-Menachem (born 1947), Israeli former politician
- Eli Bennett (born 1989), Canadian jazz saxophonist and film composer
- Eli Ben Rimoz (born 1944), Israeli former international footballer
- Eli Ben-Sasson, Israeli computer scientist and former professor
- Eli Bentley (1752–1822), American silversmith and clockmaker
- Eli ben Yehudah ha-Nazir, 10th-century Middle Easter grammarian, philologist, and teacher
- Eli Berman (born 1960), Canadian-born Jewish American scientist, writer, and professor of economics
- Eli Biham (born 1960), Israeli cryptographer, cryptanalyst, and professor
- Eli Blu (born 1961), American former professional wrestler
- Eli Boggs (?–1861), American pirate
- Eli Bornstein (born 1922), American-born Canadian artist and teacher
- Eli Bouchard (born 2007), Canadian snowboarder
- Eli Bowen (1844–1924), American circus- and sideshow performer
- Eli Bowen (American football) (born 2005), American college football player
- Eli Bradley (1883–?), English footballer
- Eli Bremer (born 1978), American Olympic modern pentathlete and politician
- Eli Broad (1933–2021), American billionaire businessman, philanthropist, and art collector
- Eli Brooks (born 1998), American professional basketball player
- Eli Brown (born 1999), American actor
- Eli Bush, American film- and theatre producer, and former executive
- Eli C. D. Shortridge (1830–1908), American politician
- Eli Cabrera (1957–2024), Northern Mariana Islands politician
- Eli Campbell (born 2004), English professional footballer
- Eli Capilouto (born 1949), American Jewish dentistry academic
- Eli Cara, Israeli criminal in the 2004 Israel–New Zealand passport scandal
- Eli Carlos (1954–2020), Brazilian professional footballer and manager
- Eli Carr (born 2001), American-born Puerto Rican footballer
- Eli Carter (born 1991), American professional basketball player
- Eli Cashdan (1905–1998), Belarusian-born British Orthodox Jewish rabbi, and Royal Air Force chaplain during World War II
- Eli Cates (1877–1964), American MLB pitcher
- Eli Caven (born 1996), English rugby union player
- Eli Chaim Carlebach (1925–1990), American Orthodox Jewish rabbi
- Eli Chesen (1944–2023), American psychiatrist, author, and artist
- Eli Chism (1916–1982), American Negro league baseball player
- Eli Clare (born 1963), American writer, activist, educator, and speaker
- Eli Clark, American past member of rock band Fit for Rivals
- Eli Cohen (disambiguation), several people
- Eli Coleman (born 1948), American psychologist, sexologist, and professor emeritus
- Eli Cook (1814–1865), American mayor
- Eli Cook (musician) (born 1986), American singer, songwriter, guitarist, and record producer
- Eli Corrêa Filho (born 1976), Brazilian politician and radio personality
- Eli Cottonwood (born 1974), American retired professional wrestler
- Eli Cox (born 2000), American NFL player
- Eli Craig, American film director, screenwriter, and actor; son of actress Sally Field
- Eli Crane (born 1980), American politician, businessman, and former Navy SEAL
- Eli Cranor (born 1988), American author and former professional footballer
- Eli Crognale (born 1997), American retired professional soccer player
- Eli Cross, several people
- Eli Culley (1840–1890), English-born American politician
- Eli D. Hoyle (1851–1921), American Army brigadier general during World War I
- Eli Danker (born 1948), Israeli actor; father of actor, singer, and model Ran Danker
- Eli Dasa (born 1992), Israeli professional footballer
- Eli Davies (?–?), Welsh professional rugby league footballer during the 1900s
- Eli Davis (1855–?), English footballer
- Eli Dawe (1843–1930), Canadian merchant and politician
- Eli Dayan (born 1949), Israeli former politician
- Eli Degibri (born 1978), Israeli jazz saxophonist, composer, and arranger
- Eli Dellal (born 1955), Israeli politician
- Eli Dershwitz (born 1995), American Olympic saber fencer
- Eli Dodson (1828–1921), American lawyer, Confederate Army officer, state legislator, and judge; served in the American Civil War
- Eli Drake, alternate name of LA Knight (born 1982), American professional wrestler
- Eli Driks (born 1964), Israeli Jewish former footballer
- Eli Durante, Brazilian retired NASL player
- Eli Eban (born 1950), Israeli-American clarinetist; son of diplomat and politician Abba Eban
- Eli Eduardo de Gortari (1918–1991), Mexican logician, philosopher of science, and engineer
- Eli Elbaz (born 1992), Israeli footballer
- Eli El-Chantiry (born 1957), Canadian former politician
- Eli Elezra (born 1960), Israeli professional poker player and businessman
- Eli Ellis (1948–2025), Australian Olympic sports shooter
- Eli Eshed, Israeli researcher of popular culture
- Eli Evankovich (born 1982), American former politician
- Eli F. Peckumn (1873–1953), American college football player and coach
- Eli Faber (1943–2020), American professor of history
- Eli Feldstein (born 1992), Israeli spokesperson and military officer
- Eli Fenichel, American economist and university professor
- Eli Finish (born 1975), Israeli Jewish actor, stand-up comedian, and impressionist
- Eli Finley (born 2004), American football player
- Eli Fletcher (1887–1954), English footballer
- Eli Frank Hollingsworth (1892–1964), American attorney and Supreme Court justice
- Eli Franklin Burton (1879–1948), Canadian physicist
- Eli Friedman (born 1933), American nephrologist and academic
- Eli Fromm (1939–2025), American electrical engineer and professor emeritus
- Eli Fuchs (1924–1992), Israeli international footballer and manager
- Eli Fuller (born 1972), Antigua and Barbuda Olympic windsurfer
- Eli Gabay (born 1959), Canadian actor
- Eli Galbraith-Knapp (born 1991), American professional soccer player
- Eli Gardner (born 1986), American football coach
- Eli Garner (born 1991), American soccer player
- Eli Gerstner (born 1980), American Orthodox Jewish singer, songwriter, and producer
- Eli Geva (born 1950), Israeli commander
- Eli Gillman (born 2003), American college football player
- Eli Gindi, American Jewish real estate developer, investor, and businessman
- Eli Ginsberg (1981–2023), Israeli lieutenant colonel
- Eli Ginzberg (1911–2002), American Jewish professor of economics
- Eli Gold (born 1953), American sportscaster and author
- Eli Goldschmidt (born 1953), Israeli former politician
- Eli Goldston (1920–1974), American business leader and spokesman
- Eli Goodman (born 1971), American film- and television actor
- Eli Goree (born 1994), Canadian actor
- Eli Gorenstein (born 1952), Israeli actor, voice actor, director, singer, and cellist
- Eli Gottlieb, American Jewish novelist
- Eli Grba (1934–2019), American MLB pitcher
- Eli Green, South Australian member of alternative metal band The Mark of Cain (band)
- Eli Greenbaum, American herpetologist and evolutionary biologist
- Eli Gross (1939–1996), Israeli graphic designer and typographer
- Eli Guttman (born 1958), Israeli former footballer and manager
- Eli Hall, Jamaican-born British nightclub doorman; perpetrator of the Hackney siege
- Eli Harari (born 1945), Israeli-American business executive
- Eli Harold (born 1994), American former NFL player
- Eli Harvey (1860–1957), American sculptor, painter, and animalier
- Eli Hawks (1829–1900), American politician and businessman
- Eli HaZe'ev (?–1980), American-born Israeli ultranationalist settler, Vietnam War veteran, and victim of the 1980 Hebron attack
- Eli Heckscher (1879–1952), Swedish political economist, economic historian, and professor
- Eli Heidenreich (born 2003), American NFL player
- Eli Heimans (1861–1914), Dutch nature educator and conservationist
- Eli Herring (born 1969), American college athlete- and high school sports coach, and Mormon missionary
- Eli Hirsch (born 1938), American philosopher and professor
- Eli Hodkey (1917–2005), American MLB pitcher
- Eli Holman (born 1989), American IBSL player
- Eli Holstein (born 2004), American college football player
- Eli Holzman (born 1974), American creator–developer, writer, producer, and television executive
- Eli Houston Murray (1843–1896), American politician, newspaper editor, and anti-Mormon; Union Army colonel during the American Civil War
- Eli Hunt (1953–2014), Native American leader and politician
- Eli Hurvitz (1932–2011), Israeli industrialist
- Eli Hurvitz (Meridor) (born 1970), Israeli philanthropist and executive director
- Eli Huston (c. 1799–1835), American lawyer and Supreme Court associate justice
- Eli Ilan (1928–1982), Canadian-born Israeli sculptor
- Eli Iserbyt (born 1997), Belgian former cyclo-cross- and road cyclist
- Eli Isom, American professional wrestler
- Eli Ives (1779–1861), American medical doctor
- Eli Izhakoff, American businessman of diamonds and jewelry
- Eli J. Richardson (born 1967), American district judge
- Eli Jacobs (born 1937), American financier and attorney
- Eli James (born 1982), American fashion designer, producer, and musician
- Eli Harrison (1903–1976), Australian politician
- Eli Janney, several people
- Eli Jean Tahchi, Lebanese Canadian filmmaker
- Eli Jenkins (American football) (born 1994), American former football player
- Eli Jerby (born 1957), Israeli scientist and professor
- Eli Jerzembeck, American son of former MLB pitcher Mike Jerzembeck
- Eli Jidere Bala (born 1954), Nigerian professor of mechanical engineering
- Eli Jones (disambiguation), several people
- Eli Juggins, alternate name of Ted Juggins (1882–1966), English professional footballer
- Eli Júnior (born 2004), Brazilian professional footballer
- Eli Junior Kroupi (born 2006), French professional footballer
- Eli Juran (1902–1955), American Negro league baseball player
- Eli K. Cole (1867–1929), American Marine Corps assistant commandant
- Eli Kaneti, Israeli basketball coach
- Elî Kaşifpûr (1957–1990), Iranian politician
- Eli Kassner (1924–2018), Canadian classical guitar teacher and musician
- Eli Katz, birth name of Gil Kane (1926–2000), American comics artist
- Eli Kent (born 1988), New Zealand playwright and actor
- Eli Keshet, Israeli Jewish biochemist and university professor
- Eli Keszler, American percussionist, composer, and visual artist
- Eli Kim (born 1991), South Korean-American singer and rapper; member of boy band U-KISS
- Eli King, several people
- Eli Kintisch, American science journalist
- Eli Kirk Price (1797–1884), American lawyer and politician
- Eli Kirk Price II (1860–1933), American lawyer; grandson of the above
- Eli Knight, real name of EK Prosper (born 2001), American professional wrestler
- Éli Kroupi (born 1979), Ivorian former professional footballer
- Eli Kulp, American chef and restaurateur
- Eli L. Huggins (1842–1929), American brigadier general and author
- Eli L. Whiteley (1913–1986), American Army infantry captain during World War II
- Eli Lake (born 1972), American journalist and podcaster
- Eli Lancman (1936–2024), Israeli historian of Japanese and East Asian art
- Eli Langer (born 1967), Canadian visual artist
- Eli Larsen (1909–1978), Danish footballer
- Eli Leon (1935–2018), American psychologist, writer, and art collector
- Eli Lequime (1811–1898), French-born American prospector
- Eli Leventhal (born 1953), Israeli former Olympic footballer
- Eli Levi, Israeli former footballer and current coach
- Eli Lieb, American pop singer-songwriter
- Eli Lilly (disambiguation), several people
- Eli Long (1837–1903), American Union Army general during the American Civil War
- Eli Lotar (1905–1969), French and Romanian photographer, cinematographer, film director, and actor
- Eli Louhenapessy (born 1976), Dutch retired footballer
- Eli M. Black (1921–1975), American businessman
- Eli M. Dannenberg (1917–1991), American Cabot scientist
- Eli M. Oboler (1915–1983), American librarian and writer
- Eli M. Pearce (1929–2015), American chemist and research professor
- Eli M. Wight (1841–1881), American mayor
- Eli Mahpud (born 1961), Israeli former association footballer and manager
- Eli Mambwe (born 1982), Zambian badminton player
- Eli Mandel (1922–1992), Canadian poet, editor of anthologies, and literary academic
- Eli Manning (born 1981), American former NFL player
- Eli Maor (born 1937), Israeli mathematician and historian of mathematics
- Eli Marcus (1854–1935), German Jewish poet, playwright, and actor
- Eli Marienthal (born 1986), American former actor
- Eli Marom (born 1955), Israeli former naval commander
- Eli Marozzi (1913–1999), Italian-born American sculptor, ceramist, teacher, and illustrator
- Eli Marques (born 1982), Brazilian retired footballer and current manager
- Eli Marrero (born 1973), Cuban former MLB player
- Eli Marsden Wilson (1877–1965), English artist
- Eli Matalon (1924–1999), Jamaican businessman and politician
- Eli Matheson (born 1983), Australian Olympic field hockey player
- Eli Meltzer (born 1979), American musician, songwriter, record producer, and performer
- Eli Mencer (born 1996), American professional football player, and former CFL player
- Eli Mendes (born 1952), Brazilian former professional footballer
- Eli Metcalfe Bruce (1828–1866), American philanthropist, financier, and politician
- Eli Mintz (1904–1988), Polish-Austrian-born Jewish American actor
- Eli Mohar (1948–2006), Israeli songwriter and columnist
- Eli Morgan (born 1996), American MLB pitcher
- Eli Moschcowitz (1879–1964), Hungarian-born Jewish American doctor and scientist
- Eli Moyal (1953–2020), Moroccan-born Israeli politician and mayor
- Eli Mwanang'onze, Zambian academic, writer, and former politician
- Eli N. Evans (1936–2022), American author and charity administrator
- Eli Nacht (born 1983), Israeli politician and lawyer
- Eli Nadel (1918–1981), American child actor
- Eli Nawi (born 1967), Israeli Paralympic rower
- Eli Ndiaye (born 2004), Senegalese-Spanish professional basketball player
- Eli Nesdoly (1931–2013), Canadian politician
- Eli Nichols (1799–1871), American farmer, lawyer, and abolitionist
- Eli Nielsen (born 1992), Faroese footballer
- Eli Nissan, Israeli DJ, producer, and musician
- Eli Njuchi (born 2001), Malawian singer, songwriter, rapper, and dancer
- Eli Noam (born 1946), American economist and professor
- Eli Noyes (1942–2024), American animator
- Eli Oberstein (1901–1960), American record producer and music business executive
- Eli Ohana (born 1964), Israeli former professional footballer and coach
- Eli Ostreicher (1983–2023), British-born American Orthodox Jewish serial entrepreneur
- Eli Otis Rudd (1825–1884), American businessman, politician, and pioneer
- Eli Oudenryn (born 2005), New Zealand rugby union player
- Eli P. Ashmun (1770–1819), American politician
- Eli P. Clark (1847–1931), American pioneer railway builder
- Eli P. Farmer (1794–1881), American Methodist Episcopal preacher, businessman, politician, and newspaper editor
- Eli Paewai, New Zealand past member of pop rock band Six60
- Eli Pancol (born 2000), American NFL player
- Eli "Paperboy" Reed (born 1983), American singer and songwriter
- Eli Pariser (born 1980), American author, activist, and entrepreneur
- Eli Parsons (1748–1830), American activist, and Continental Army officer during the American Revolutionary War
- Eli Pasquale (1960–2019), Canadian Olympic basketball player
- Eli Peck Miller (1828–1912), American physician, hydrotherapist, vegetarian, and natural hygiene advocate
- Eli Pederson (1837–1909), American farmer and politician
- Eli Pemberton (born 1997), American PLK player
- Eli Perkins, pen name of Melville D. Landon (1839–1910), American humorist, lecturer, and journalist
- Eli Perry (1799–1881), American businessman
- Eli Pigot (?–1908), African-American man whom a mob of white people lynched
- Eli Piilonen, American video game developer
- Eli Postin (1908–1991), English professional footballer
- Eli Putievsky (1942–2017), Israeli botanist and scientist
- Eli Rarey, American independent filmmaker
- Eli Raridon (born 2004), American NFL player
- Eli Reed (born 1946), American photographer and photojournalist
- Eli Remolona (born 1952), Filipino economist and governor
- Eli Rezne Wong (born 1991), Northern Mariana Islands swimmer
- Eli Ricks (born 2001), American professional football player
- Eli Robins (1921–1994), American psychiatrist
- Eli Robinson (1908–1972), American jazz trombonist and arranger
- Eli Rogers (born 1992), American former professional football player
- Eli Rosebraugh (1875–1930), American MLB pitcher
- Eli Rosenbaum (born 1955), American lawyer
- Eli Rotenberg (born c. 1965), American physicist
- Eli Roth (born 1972), American film director, screenwriter, producer, and actor
- Eli Rozenberg (born 1993), Israeli American Orthodox Jewish entrepreneur
- Eli Rubenstein (born 1959), Canadian Orthodox Jewish Holocaust educator, writer, storyteller, filmmaker, activist, and rabbi
- Eli Ruckenstein (1925–2020), American university professor and physical chemist
- Eli Russell Linnetz, American creative director, fashion designer, photographer, and artist
- Eli S. Ricker (1843–1926), American Union Army corporal during the American Civil War, and newspaper editor, rancher, judge, and activist
- Eli S. Shorter (1823–1879), American politician
- Eli Sabiá (born 1988), Brazilian professional footballer
- Eli Sadan (born 1948), Hungarian-born Israeli Orthodox Jewish rabbi
- Eli Sagan (1927–2015), American businessman
- Eli Salama (born 1996), Canadian NLL player
- Eli Salzberger (born 1960), Israeli legal scholar, professor, and former dean
- Eli Sanders (born 1977/1978), American journalist and former associate editor
- Eli San Fernando (born 1996), Filipino labor leader, politician, and Internet personality
- Eli Saslow (born 1982), American Jewish journalist, sportscaster, and screenwriter
- Eli Saulsbury (1817–1893), American lawyer and politician
- Eli Savit (born 1982/1983), American lawyer, professor, and politician
- Eli Scarpati, American member of indie rock duo Um, Jennifer?
- Eli Schechtman (1908–1996), Ukrainian-born Jewish Yiddish writer, novelist, and military personnel
- Eli Schenkel (born 1992), Canadian Olympic fencer
- Eli Schlanger, Israeli-Australian assistant Jewish rabbi and prison chaplain; victim of the 2025 Bondi Beach shooting
- Eli Schwartz, Israeli physician
- Eli Scott (born 1999), American former SBL player, and current college basketball coach
- Eli Segal (1943–2006), American businessman, philanthropist, politician, and social entrepreneur
- Eli Shamir (1934–2026), Israeli mathematician, computer scientist, and professor emeritus of computer science
- Eli Sharabi (born 1972), Israeli former hostage
- Eli Sharvit, Israeli Navy general
- Eli Shelby Hammond (1838–1904), American district judge
- Eli Sheldon Glover (1844–1920), American artist and publisher of maps, and inventor
- Eli Shukron, Israeli archaeologist
- Eli Siegel (1902–1978), Latvian-American poet, writer, critic, educator, and philosopher
- Eli Simon (born 1987/1988), American businessman; son of billionaire real estate developer David Simon (CEO)
- Eli Simpson (1884–1962), British caver and speleologist
- Eli Sivister (1911–1993), English professional footballer
- Eli Small (1767–1837), English professional cricketer
- Eli Smith (1801–1857), American Protestant missionary and scholar
- Eli Snyman (born 1996), Zimbabwe-born South African rugby union player
- Eli Somer (born 1951), Israeli professor of clinical psychology, and scientific advisor
- Eli Soriano (1947–2021), Filipino preacher and televangelist
- Eli Sostre, American R&B singer, producer, and songwriter
- Eli Sprecher (born 1963), Israeli physician-scientist
- Eli Stefansky (born 1972), American-Israeli lecturer
- Eli Sternberg (1917–1988), Austrian-born American researcher and professor
- Eli Sthapit, Australian member of rock band Civic (band)
- Eli Stokols (born 1978/1979), American journalist
- Eli Stowers (born 2003), American NFL player
- Eli Strand (1943–2008), American NFL player
- Eli Suissa (born 1956), Moroccan-born Israeli Orthodox Jewish rabbi, and former politician
- Eli Sukunda (born 1949), Canadian Olympic fencer
- Eli T. (born 1982), Singaporean electropop artist
- Eli T. Stackhouse (1824–1892), American politician, and Confederate Army officer during the American Civil War
- Eli Templeton (born 1995), Australian former AFL player
- Eli Tene, American businessman; founder of Peak Companies
- Elî Teremaxî, 17th- and 18th-century Kurdish linguist, writer, and teacher
- Eli Terry (1772–1852), American inventor and clockmaker
- Eli Thayer (1819–1899), American politician
- Eli the Eliminator (born 1961), American retired professional wrestler
- Eli Thomas Reich (1913–1999), American Navy officer during World War II
- Eli Thompson, several people
- Eli Thomson, American member of musician Father John Misty's backing band
- Eli Timoner (1928–2021), American entrepreneur and business executive
- Eli Todd (1769–1833), American pioneer in the treatment of mentally ill people
- Eli Todd Tappan (1824–1888), American educator, mathematician, author, lawyer, and newspaper editor
- Eli Tomac (born 1992), American professional Motocross- and Supercross racer
- Eli Turkel (born 1944), Israeli applied mathematician and university emeritus professor
- Eli Turner (1893–1937), English footballer
- Eli Underwood (1907–2000), American Negro league baseball player
- Eli Upfal, Israeli computer science researcher and professor
- Eli Uzan (1963–2009), Israeli footballer
- Eli Vakil (born 1953), Israeli clinical neuropsychologist and professor emeritus
- Eli Valley (born 1970), American cartoonist and author
- Eli Velder (1925–2020), American academic
- Eli Verschleiser (born 1974), American businessman
- Eli Villalobos (born 1997), American MLB pitcher
- Eli Wachtel, American financier and investor
- Eli Wager (1926–2003), American politician
- Eli Waldron (1916–1980), American writer and journalist
- Eli Walker (born 1992), Welsh retired international rugby union player
- Eli Wallach (1915–2014), American film-, television-, and stage actor
- Eli Waste (1827–1894), American farmer and politician
- Eli Whiteside (born 1979), American former MLB catcher, and current roving catching instructor
- Eli Whitney (disambiguation), several people
- Eli Williams (baseball) (1916–2003), American Negro league baseball player
- Eli Willits (born 2007), American MLB player
- Eli Wilner (born 1956), American businessman, and art dealer, collector, and restorer
- Eli Wilson, Canadian former NHL goaltending coach
- Eli Winch (1848–1938), American manufacturer and politician
- Eli Wolf (born 1997), American NFL player
- Eli Woods (1923–2014), English comedian and comic actor
- Eli Wright, American candidate in the California's 54th State Assembly district
- Eli Wulfmeier, American past member of rock band Dorothy (band)
- Eli Yablonovitch (born 1946), American physicist and engineer
- Eli Yatzpan (born 1965), Israeli television host and comedian
- Eli Yishai (born 1962), Israeli politician
- Eli Zakour, Trinidad and Tobago politician
- Eli Zaret (born 1950), American sports broadcaster and journalist
- Eli Zeira (1928–2025), Israeli major general
- Eli Zelkha (1950–2017), Iranian-American entrepreneur, venture capitalist, and professor; inventor of ambient intelligence
- Eli Zizov (born 1991), Israeli footballer
- Eli Zuckerman (born 1973), Israeli Olympic competitive sailor

=== Female ===
- Eli (musician) (born 2000), American singer-songwriter
- Eli Ahmed (born 1934), Indian writer, scriptwriter, director, lyricist, costume designer, actress, columnist, and social activist
- Eli Årdal Berland (1952–2025), Norwegian politician
- Eli Arnstad (born 1962), Norwegian civil servant, sports official, and politician
- Eli Artola (born 1967), Spanish former international footballer
- Eli Bartra (born 1947), Mexican feminist philosopher, researcher, and university professor
- Eli Blakstad (born 1962), Norwegian politician
- Eli Colter (1890–1984), American short story writer
- Eli Coppola (1961–2000), American poet
- Eli del Estal (born 1993), Spanish footballer
- Eli Easton, pen name of Jane Jensen (video game designer) (born 1963), American video game designer and author
- Eli Erlick (born 1995), American activist, writer, and academic
- Eli Fantasy (born 1994), Puerto Rican urban singer, songwriter, model, and dancer
- Eli Fara (born 1967), Albanian singer
- Eli Fischer-Jørgensen (1911–2010), Danish professor of phonetics, and member of the Danish resistance movement
- Eli Giannini (born 1956), Italian-born Australian architect and director of architects
- Eli Gras (born 1971), Spanish composer, multi-instrumentalist, illustrator, photographer, writer, and graphic designer
- Eli Hagen (born 1947), Norwegian television presenter; wife of politician Carl I. Hagen
- Eli Heil (1929–2017), Brazilian painter, sculptor, ceramicist, tapestry maker, and poet
- Eli Hutchinson (born 1996), American-born Israeli Jewish former USLS player
- Eli Jakovska (born 1995), Macedonian footballer
- Eli Johana Moreno (born 1985), Colombian Olympic hammer thrower
- Eli Kristiansen (1933–2025), Norwegian politician
- Eli Krog (1891–1970), Norwegian publicist, translator, and author
- Eli Landa (born 1984), Norwegian model, bank employee, teacher, and beauty pageant titleholder
- Eli Landsem (born 1962), Norwegian former international footballer and coach
- Eli-Marie Johnsen (1926–2015), Norwegian textile artist and lecturer
- Eli Marie Raasok (born 1996), Norwegian handball player
- Eli Rygg (born 1955), Norwegian television personality and children's writer
- Eli Skolmen Ryg (born 1936), Norwegian television producer
- Eli Sollied Øveraas (born 1949), Norwegian politician
- Eli Soyud (born 1995), Filipina volleyball player
- Eli Telhaug (born 1962), Norwegian civil servant
- Eli Urbanová (1922–2012), Czech poet, novelist, and Esperantist
- Eli Wasserscheid (born 1978), German actress
- Eli Wathne (born 1970), Norwegian politician

== Surname ==
=== Male ===
- Billy Eli (born 1962), American singer and songwriter
- Bobby Eli (1946–2023), American musician, arranger, composer, and record producer
- Dwight Eli (born 1982), Dutch former footballer
- Look Tin Eli (1870–1919), Chinese-American businessman
- Mike Eli, American member of country music band Eli Young Band
- Ovadia Eli (born 1945), Israeli former politician
- Roger Eli (born 1965), English former professional footballer
- Vivian Eli (born 1938), Dominican former cricketer

=== Female ===
- Beatrice Eli (born 1987), Swedish musician, singer, and songwriter

=== Fictional characters ===
- Eli, in the action-adventure stealth video game series Metal Gear Solid, voiced by Banjō Ginga (Japanese) and Cam Clarke (English) in the original game; and Yūtarō Honjō (Japanese) and Piers Stubbs (English) in Metal Gear Solid V
- Eli, in the US teen comedy-drama TV series Freaks and Geeks, played by Ben Foster
- Eli, in the US sword-and-sorcery TV series Xena: Warrior Princess, played by Timothy Omundson
- Eli, in the UK soap opera Hollyoaks, played by Marc Silcock
- Eli, in the 1964 Swedish children's book Eli Lives in Israel
- Eli, in the 2010 US post-apocalyptic neo-Western action film The Book of Eli, played by Denzel Washington
- Eli, in the 2004 Swedish vampire novel Let the Right One In, played by Lina Leandersson in its 2008 film adaptation
- Eli Ayase, in the Japanese anime Love Live!, voiced by Yoshino Nanjō (Japanese) and Erica Lindbeck (English)
- Eli Baker, in the Australian TV soap opera Neighbours, played by P. J. Lane
- Eli Bard, in the US comic book publisher Marvel Comics
- Eli Bradley, in the US comic book publisher Marvel Comics
- Eli Cardale/Eli Ever, in the 2013 US novel Vicious
- Eli Cardashyan, in the US post-apocalyptic comedy drama TV series Daybreak, played by Gregory Kasyan
- Eli Carson, in the US prime-time soap opera Peyton Place, played by Frank Ferguson
- Eli Cash, in the 2001 US comedy-drama film The Royal Tenenbaums, played by Owen Wilson
- Eli Clark, in the 2018 free-to-play asymmetrical survival horror video game Identity V
- Eli Cross, in the 1980 US satirical psychological black comedy film The Stunt Man, played by Peter O'Toole
- Eli Damaskinos, in the 2002 US superhero film Blade II, played by Thomas Kretschmann
- Eli David, in the US military police procedural TV series NCIS, played by Michael Nouri (and by Ben Morrison as a younger David in flashbacks)
- Eli Dingle, in the UK TV soap opera Emmerdale, played by Joe Gilgun
- Eli Gemstone, in the US crime comedy-drama TV series The Righteous Gemstones, played by John Goodman
- Eli Gold, in the US legal political drama TV series The Good Wife, played by Alan Cumming
- Eli Goldsworthy, in the Canadian teen drama TV series Degrassi: The Next Generation, played by Munro Chambers
- Eli Grant, in the US TV soap opera Days of Our Lives, played by Lamon Archey
- Eli Hobson, in the US science fiction drama TV series For All Mankind, played by Daniel Stern
- Eli James, in the US supernatural TV series Ghost Whisperer, played by Jamie Kennedy
- Eli Jenkins, in the 1954 Welsh radio drama Under Milk Wood
- Eli Kilgore, in the webcomic Ugly Hill
- Eli Loker, in the US crime drama TV series Lie to Me, played by Brendan Hines
- Eli Love, in the US daytime TV soap opera General Hospital, played by Rick Springfield
- Eli Mills, in the 2018 US science fiction action film Jurassic World: Fallen Kingdom, played by Rafe Spall
- Eli Morrow, in the US TV series Agents of S.H.I.E.L.D., played by José Zúñiga
- Eli "Weevil" Navarro, in the US teen neo-noir mystery drama TV series Veronica Mars, played by Francis Capra
- Eli Pope, in the US political thriller TV series Scandal, played by Joe Morton
- Eli Rabbit, in the UK TV sitcom Year of the Rabbit, played by Matt Berry
- Eli Raphelson, in the 2013 US political action thriller film White House Down, played by Richard Jenkins
- Eli Roosevelt, in the US action crime drama TV series Sons of Anarchy, played by Rockmond Dunbar
- Eli Shane, in the Canadian animated TV series Slugterra, voiced by Sam Vincent
- Eli Sjursdotter, in the 1938 Norwegian drama film Eli Sjursdotter, played by Sonja Wigert
- Eli Squinch, in the Mickey Mouse universe
- Eli Stone, in the US comedy legal drama TV series Eli Stone, played by Jonny Lee Miller
- Eli Stram, in the US action drama TV series 24, played by Silas Weir Mitchell
- Eli Sunday, in the 2007 US epic period drama film There Will Be Blood, played by Paul Dano
- Elias "Eli" Thompson, in the US period crime drama TV series Boardwalk Empire, played by Shea Whigham, and by Ryan Dinning and Oakes Fegley (in flashbacks)
- Eli Tomorast, in Greyhawk
- Eli Vance, in the first-person shooter video games Half-Life
- Eli Vanto, in the 2017 US novel Star Wars: Thrawn
- Eli Wallace, in the military science fiction drama TV series Stargate Universe, played by David Blue
- Eli Watkins, in the 1926-1927 US novel Oil!
- Eli Williams, in the US TV sitcom Boy Meets World, played by Alex Désert

== See also ==
- Elie (given name)
- Elie (surname)
- Eliezer (disambiguation)
- Elihu
- Ely (surname)
- Ely (given name)
