= Vivian Eli =

Dominican cricketer (born 1938)

Personal information
- Full name: Vivian Raphael Eli
- Born: 13 July 1938 (age 88); Roseau, Dominica
- Batting: Right-handed
- Bowling: Right-arm medium-fast

Domestic team information
- Years: Team
- 1959: Windward Islands
- Source: CricketArchive, 4 March 2016

Vivian Raphael Eli (born 13 July 1938) is a former Dominican cricketer who played for the Windward Islands in West Indian domestic cricket. A right-arm pace bowler, he was the first Dominican to play first-class cricket.

In December 1959, aged 21, Eli was selected to represent the Windward Islands against England, in what was the team's inaugural first-class match. The only Dominican selected for the match, he scored no runs and took no wickets, bowling third behind Frank Mason and Theo Redhead in each innings. Eli never again played at first-class level.
