= Ely (given name) =

Ely is a given name which may refer to:

- Ely Allen (born 1986), American former soccer player
- Ely do Amparo (1921-1991), Brazilian footballer
- Eleandre Ely Buendia (born 1970), Filipino musician, writer and director, songwriter and lead vocalist of the rock band Eraserheads
- Ely Callaway Jr. (1919-2001), founder of Callaway Golf Company
- Eliezer Ely Capacio (1955–2014), Philippine Basketball Association player, coach and executive
- Ely Culbertson (1891–1955), American contract bridge player, popularizer and writer
- Ely Galleani (born 1953), Italian retired film actress
- Ely Guerra (born 1972), Mexican singer-songwriter
- Ely Jacques Kahn (1884–1972), American commercial architect
- Ely S. Parker (1828-1895), Seneca attorney, engineer, diplomat, Union brevet brigadier general in the American Civil War and first Native American Commissioner of Indian Affairs
- Ely Santos (born 1977), Brazilian politician
- Ely Tacchella (1936–2017), Swiss former footballer
- Ely Thadeu (born 1982), Brazilian footballer

== See also ==
- Eli (name)
