= The Company of Myself =

2009 video game

- Screenshot of the game
- Developer: Eli Piilonen
- Platforms: Browser, Flash
- Release: 2010
- Genre: Puzzle platformer
- Mode: Single-player

The Company of Myself is a 2009 Flash platformer by Eli Piilonen featuring a hermit as the protagonist whose depressed inner thoughts appears as writing on the "walls" of the game. Piilonen has stated that the "core intent [of the game] is to be half puzzle game and half character study". It has been frequently cited as an early example of an art game and has received praise for how it deals with issues of mental health. Tom Fronczak of Destructoid called the game "brilliant". It was included in Michael Rose's 2014 book 250 Indie Games You Must Play and has been frequently cited in video games research. Piilonen later released a prequel for the game called Fixation.
