= Eli Júnior =

Brazilian footballer (born 2004)

Personal information
- Full name: Eli Silvano Kovalik Júnior
- Date of birth: 23 March 2004 (age 22)
- Place of birth: Rio Azul, Brazil
- Height: 1.77 m (5 ft 10 in)
- Position: Forward

Team information
- Current team: Atlético Goianiense (on loan from Operário Ferroviário)

Youth career
- 2018: Atlético Paranaense
- 2019–2021: Chapecoense
- 2022–: Operário Ferroviário
- 2024–: → Atlético Goianiense (loan)

Senior career*
Years	Team	Apps	(Gls)
2024–	Operário Ferroviário	0	(0)
2024–	→ Atlético Goianiense (loan)	1	(0)
- * Club domestic league appearances and goals as of 20:31, 27 September 2024 (UTC)

Eli Silvano Kovalik Júnior (born 23 March 2004), known as Eli Júnior, is a Brazilian professional footballer who plays as a forward for Atlético Goianiense, on loan from Operário Ferroviário.

== Career ==
Born in Rio Azul, Paraná, Eli Júnior represented Atlético Paranaense, Chapecoense and Operário Ferroviário as a youth. On 16 April 2024, he was loaned to Atlético Goianiense until the end of the year, being initially assigned to the under-20 squad.

Eli Júnior made his senior – and Série A – debut on 11 August 2024, coming on as a second-half substitute for Gabriel Baralhas in a 1–0 away loss to São Paulo.

== Career statistics ==
As of 27 September 2024

Club	Season	League			State League		Cup		Continental		Other		Total	
Club	Season	Division	Apps	Goals	Apps	Goals	Apps	Goals	Apps	Goals	Apps	Goals	Apps	Goals
Atlético Goianiense	2024	Série A	1	0	—		—		—		—		1	0
Career total			1	0	0	0	0	0	0	0	0	0	1	0
