= Eli Baptist =

American abolitionist

- Born: 1820; Cumberland, Pennsylvania, United States
- Died: May 26, 1905 (aged 84–85)

Eli Baptist (1820 - May 26, 1905) was an American abolitionist and a leader of the African-American community in Springfield, Massachusetts.

== Life ==
Baptist was born free in Cumberland, Pennsylvania. He moved to Springfield, Massachusetts around 1846, where he worked first at a window blind factory and then, following the factory's closure, as a peddler of soap and candles.

He became an associate of abolitionist John Brown after he moved to Springfield in 1847. In 1851, Baptist may have become a member of the League of Gileadites, a group in part founded by Brown to resist the Fugitive Slave Act and protect Springfield's African-American community.

In 1860, Baptist decided to immigrate to Haiti alongside Perry and Ruth Cox Adams and the families of Henry Griffin and Henry Joseph James. He returned to New York City in June 1864, and from there returned to Springfield, after which point he became "one of the city's leading citizens".

Baptist was a member of the Sanford Street Church (also called the Free Church and St. John's Congregational), and held a number of roles there over the years. In 1866, Baptist and Thomas Thomas founded the Union Mutual Beneficial Society and the Masonic Lodge in Springfield. In 1884, the Massachusetts Governor gave Baptist a "justice of the peace commission". In 1885, Baptist served as a pallbearer at the funeral of physician Jefferson Church, whose home in Springfield had served as an Underground Railroad stop.

Baptist died on May 26, 1905, at age 85, from "the infirmities of age and an old case of Bright's disease".
