= Eli Heil =

Brazilian artist

- Born: Eli Malvina Heil; 1929; Palhoça, Santa Catarina State, Brazil
- Died: 10 September 2017 (aged 87–88); Florianópolis, Brazil
- Occupations: Painter, sculptor, ceramicist, tapestry maker, and poet
- Known for: Her unique style, often referred to as naïve or primitive art.

Eli Heil (1929–2017) was a Brazilian painter, sculptor, ceramicist, tapestry maker, and poet. She exhibited on numerous occasions in Brazil and abroad.

== Early life ==
Eli Malvina Heil was born in 1929 in Palhoça in Santa Catarina State in Brazil. She spent her childhood and youth in the neighbouring municipality of Santo Amaro da Imperatriz, becoming a physical education teacher. She eventually moved to Florianópolis, where she taught physical education at a college, before dedicating herself fully to artistic activity from 1962.

== Artistic work ==
Heil was self-taught. Her work followed a unique style and galleries always found difficulty in classifying her, variously using "art brut", "naïve art", "primitive art", "innate art" or, even "unusual art". Initially, she drew animals and painted landscapes of hills with houses based on the urban landscape of Florianópolis, using thick layers of paint and saturated colours. In 1962, she held her first solo exhibition, in Florianópolis. She then began to develop three-dimensional objects, applying rag dolls to the surface of a canvas and creating imaginary beings with different materials, such as ceramics, cement, wood, mortar and melted plastics, resulting in hybrid beings composed of human, animal and mythological characters. She had a show at the Museum of Contemporary Art of the University of São Paulo (MAC-USP) in 1966. Two years later, she started to exhibit in Europe. She participated in the First Latin American Biennial of São Paulo, in 1978, and in the 16th International Biennial of São Paulo in 1981. The Santa Catarina Art Museum (MASC) held a retrospective exhibition of her work in 1982.

== O Mundo Ovo ==
In 1987, she created O Mundo Ovo (The Egg World) in Florianópolis where she set up her studio and a space for the permanent exhibition of her art, bringing together a collection of over 3000 works. Many of her sculptures are displayed in the museum's garden. These included totems called Adam and Eve, polychrome sculptures over three metres high, which stood at the entrance to the museum. However, they had to be removed in 1990 as a result of road widening. Heil then buried them in a "cemetery" in the garden. In 1994, her O Mundo Ovo Foundation officially opened. It also has an archive of books, catalogues, printed matter and other documents associated with Heil.

== Death ==
Heil died in Florianópolis from a heart attack on 10 September 2017. She had suffered from asthma for years and had had severe respiratory attacks.

== Solo exhibitions ==
Heil's solo exhibitions were:

- 1962 - Florianópolis - Galeria Baú
- 1963 - Rio de Janeiro - Instituto Brasil-Estados Unidos (IBEU)
- 1963 - Brasília - Alliance Française
- 1964 - Rio de Janeiro - IBEU
- 1964 - Florianópolis - Federal University of Santa Catarina
- 1966 - Florianópolis - Santa Catarina Art Museum (MASC)
- 1966 - São Paulo SP - Museum of Contemporary Art of the University of São Paulo - MAC/USP
- 1967 - Paris (France) - Individual, at Solstice Gallery
- 1967 - Florianópolis - Federal University of Santa Catarina.
- 1968 - Ibiza - Ivan Spence Gallery
- 1968 - Paris - Galerie M. Benezite
- 1968 - Porto Alegre - Rio Grande do Sul Museum of Art (MARGS)
- 1969 - Amsterdam - Galeria Espace
- 1969 - Florianópolis - MASC
- 1971 - Florianópolis - MASC
- 1971 - Paris - Solstice Gallery
- 1971 - Rio de Janeiro - Galeria Barcinski
- 1971 - Amsterdam - Galerie Espace
- 1971 - Blumenau - Galeria Açu-Açu
- 1973 - Copenhagen - Louisiana Museum
- 1973 - Oslo - Sorya Henis Onstad Museum
- 1973 - Paris - Debret Gallery
- 1973 - Paris - L'Oeil de Boeuf Gallery
- 1973 - Paris - M. Benezite Gallery
- 1974 - Florianópolis - MASC
- 1974 - São Paulo - Galeria Oca
- 1977 - Paris - L'Oeil de Boeuf Gallery
- 1978 - Paris - L'Oeil de Boeuf Gallery
- 1982 - Florianópolis - MASC
- 1984 - Florianópolis - Retrospective at MASC
- 1984 - Paris - L'Oeil de Boeuf Gallery
- 1986 - Brasília - Retrospective at the Brasília Art Museum
- 1986 - Florianópolis - MASC
- 1989 - Paris - L'Oeil de Boeuf Gallery
- 1990 - Florianópolis - MASC
- 1992 - Florianópolis - “30 years of Art”, at the Santa Catarina Association of Plastic Artists (ACAP)
- 1993 - Florianópolis - AABB Cultural Space
- 1995 - Florianópolis - “66 Years of Life”, at the Development Bank of Santa Catarina (BADESC)
