= Santa Catarina Art Museum =

Museum in Florianopolis, Brazil

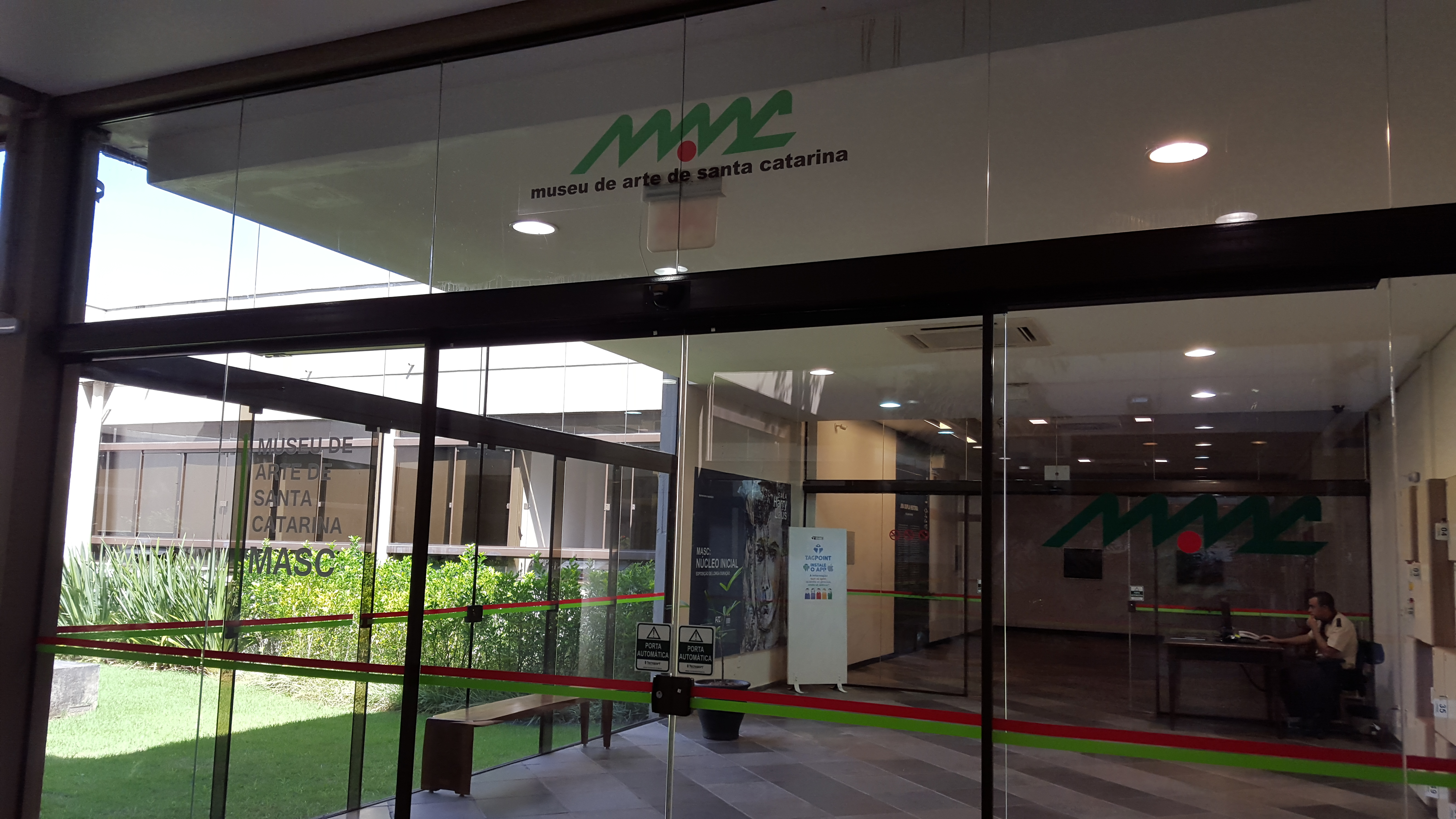
- Location: Brazil
- Coordinates: 27°34′39″S 48°31′34″W
- Website: www.masc.sc.gov.br
- Location of Santa Catarina Art Museum

The Museu de Arte de Santa Catarina (MASC), was created in 1949 as Museu de Arte Moderna de Florianópolis (MAMF), and, since then, is the official institution for fine arts in Santa Catarina. Also known as MASC, it is an institution linked to the Fundação Catarinense de Cultura (FCC) and is currently housed in the building of the Centro Integrado de Cultura (CIC), at Avenida Gov. Irineu Bornhausen, No. 5600, Agronômica, in the city of Florianópolis, State of Santa Catarina. Created by State Decree No. 433 on March 18, 1949 as the Museum of Modern Art of Florianópolis (MAMF), it is, since then, the official organ in the area of plastic arts in the state.
