= Ely Santos =

Brazilian politician (born 1977)

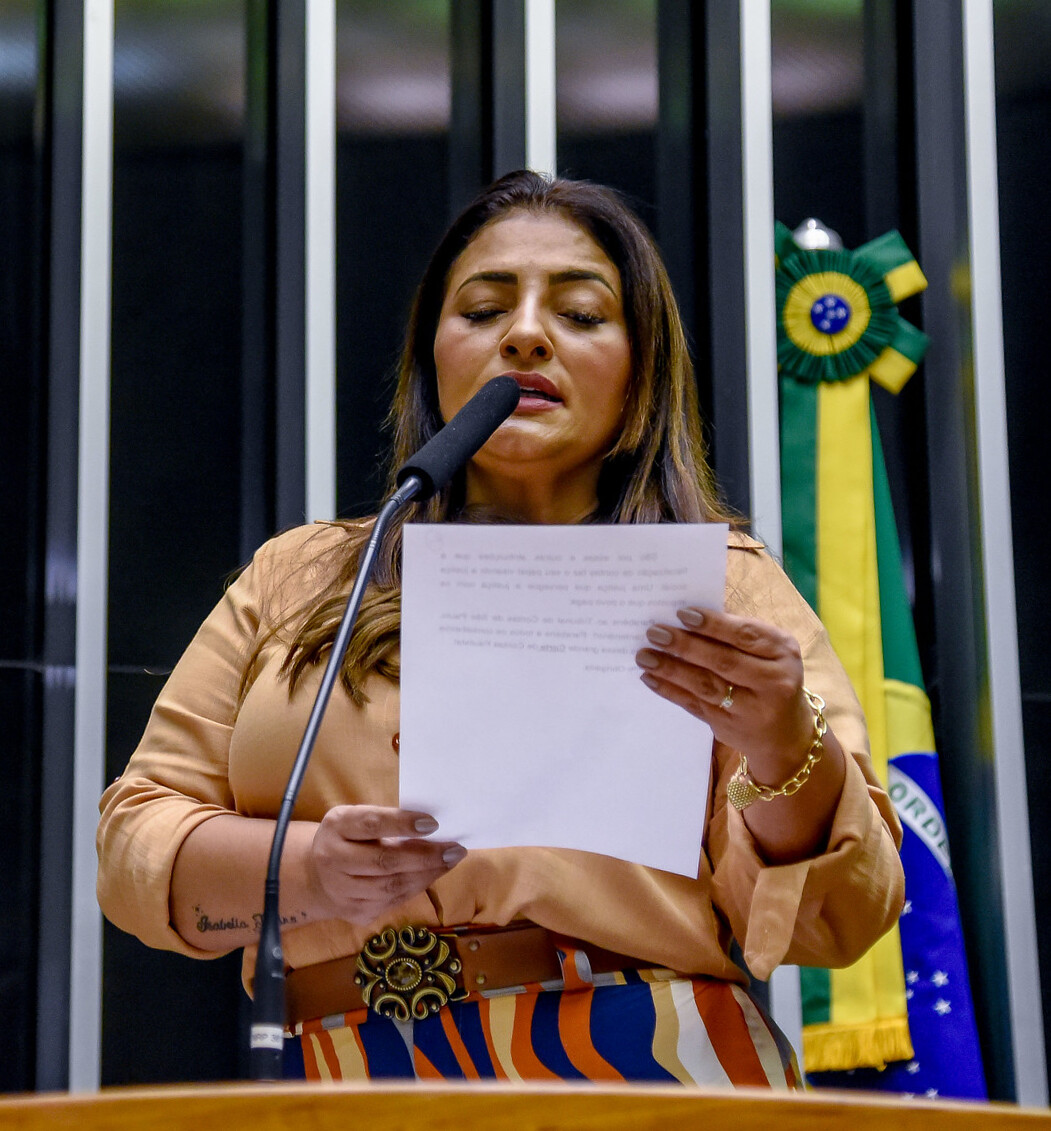
- Santos in 2025

Member of the Chamber of Deputies
- Incumbent
- Assumed office 5 July 2023
- Preceded by: Milton Vieira
- Constituency: São Paulo
- In office 9 November 2021 – 10 March 2022
- Preceded by: Roberto Alves
- Succeeded by: Roberto Alves
- Constituency: São Paulo

Personal details
- Born: 13 January 1977 (age 49)
- Party: Republicans (since 2016)

Eliane de Sousa Alves Machado (born 13 January 1977), better known as Ely Santos, is a Brazilian politician. She has been a member of the Chamber of Deputies since 2023, having previously served from 2021 to 2022. From 2017 to 2020, she served as secretary of human resources of Embu das Artes.
