= Eli Nissan =

Israeli DJ, producer and musician

Eli Nissan (Hebrew: אלי ניסן) is an Israeli DJ, producer and musician based in Tel Aviv. Born in Netanya, Nissan was a guitarist and singer/songwriter for Israeli band Portrait before shifting to electronic music.

== Discography ==
=== Albums ===
Casablanca EP [Lost Miracle Label] CASABLANCA / LYLA (June 25, 2021)

- The Last Poem, Lost & Found, 2019

=== Singles & EPs ===
- "Karnaval", Lost & Found, 2020
- "Liquid Stars" (EP), Lost & Found, 2017
