= Eli Wilner =

American art collector (born 1956)

Eli Wilner (born 1956) is an American businessman specializing in American and European period frames from the 19th through the early 20th century. He is a frame dealer, collector, and restorer.

== Education ==
Wilner is a graduate of Brandeis University, where he received a BA in Fine Arts in 1976, and of Hunter College, where he received his MA in 1978.

== Professional affiliations ==
Lyman Allyn Art Museum, Steering Committee Member
William Benton Museum of Art, Collections Committee Member
Metropolitan Museum of Art, The William Society and Bryant Fellow
Smithsonian American Art Museum, Art Forum, Director’s Circle, and Archives of American Art Advisory Board Member
Thomas Moran Trust, Advisory Council Member
Samuel H. Kress Foundation, Fellow

== Career ==
In 1983, Eli Wilner founded Eli Wilner & Company, a New York City gallery that specializes in European and American frames from the 15th century through the present. He is a leading frame dealer, restorer and collector, as well as an acknowledged and published authority on the art of framing. Wilner was honored by the Historic Charleston Foundation with the Samuel Gaillard Stoney Conservation Craftsmanship Award, for work in historic picture frame conservation. In 2024 the Bard Graduate Center selected Eli Wilner to be a recipient of the 27th Annual Iris Foundation Award, which is presented annually to honor professionals in the field of decorative arts.

Eli Wilner has framed over 10,000 paintings, including 28 paintings for The White House and Washington Crossing the Delaware for The Metropolitan Museum of Art. An interview with Morley Safer from CBS Sunday Morning about this project can be viewed at EliWilner.com. For over four decades, Eli Wilner has loaned hundreds of frames for the Old Master, 19th Century European and American Paintings, and Impressionist and Modern sales at Sotheby’s and Christie’s.

Since 1983, Eli Wilner & Company has published over 100 articles about the antique frame, and collaborated with curators from the Metropolitan Museum of Art, the Parrish Art Museum, National Academy Museum, the Columbus Museum of Art, and many more, on their exhibitions of antique frames.

In the past decade, Eli Wilner & Company has increased its Museum Frame Funding Program to provide funding to allow both large and small institutions to complete needed framing initiatives. Through this program, frame restoration projects have been completed recently for Aiken-Rhett House, American Academy of Arts and Letters, Bowdoin Museum, Clinton County Historical Society, Columbia University Libraries, Fenimore Art Museum, Georgia Museum of Art, Krannert Art Museum, Mattatuck Museum, Pennsylvania Academy of the Fine Arts, RISD Museum, University of Denver Art Collections, Walpole Library, and Washington and Lee University. Replica frames have been created for the Allentown Art Museum, Amon Carter Museum, Benton Museum, Eskenazi Museum of Art, Fred Jones Jr. Museum of Art, Guggenheim, Mattatuck Museum, Metropolitan Museum of Art, Milwaukee Art Museum, Montreal Museum of Fine Arts, National Museum of Wildlife Art, New Britain Museum of American Art, Palm Springs Art Museum, Palmer Museum, Phillips Academy, RISD Museum, Rockwell Museum of Art, and the Whitney Western Art Museum.

== Publications ==
Antique American Frames: Identification and Price Guide
The Gilded Edge

== Books ==
- The Gilded Edge Revised Edition: The Art of the Frame (2011)
- The Gilded Edge: The Art of the Frame (2000)
- Antique American Frames: Identification and Price Guide 2nd Edition (1999) (with Mervyn Kaufman)
- Antique American Frames: Identification and Price Guide (1995) (with Mervyn Kaufman)
- The Art of the Frame: American Frames of the Arts and Crafts Period (1988)
