= Rio Azul, Paraná =

Coordinates: 25°43′58″S 50°47′45″W

Rio Azul Rio Azul, Paraná
- Municipality
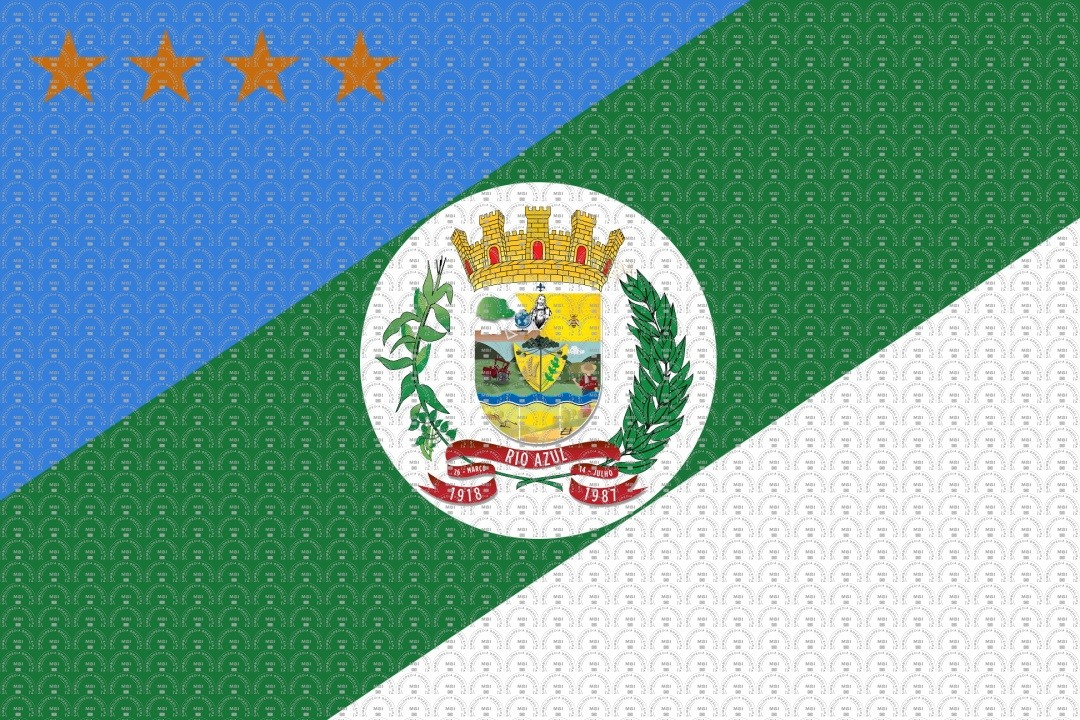
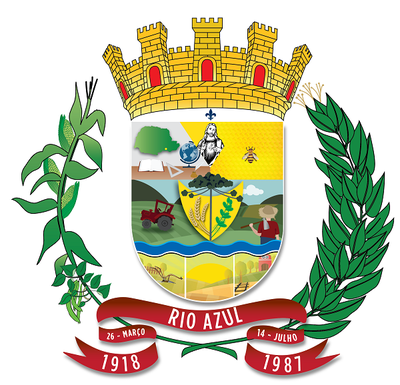
- Flag Coat of arms
- Interactive map of Rio Azul
- Country: Brazil
- Region: Southern
- State: Paraná
- Mesoregion: Sudeste Paranaense

Area
  - Total: 243,144 sq mi (629,739 km^{2})

Population (2020)
  - Total: 15,336
  - Density: 58.0/sq mi (22.38/km^{2})
- Time zone: UTC−3 (BRT)
- Area code: +55 42

Rio Azul, Paraná is a municipality in the state of Paraná in the Southern Region of Brazil.

== See also ==
- List of municipalities in Paraná
