= Eli Lilly (disambiguation) =

Eli Lilly (1839–1898) was the founder of Eli Lilly and Company.

Eli Lilly may also refer to:

- Eli Lilly and Company, a global pharmaceutical company founded in 1876
- Eli Lilly (industrialist, born 1885) (1885–1977), former president of Eli Lilly and Company, grandson of founder Eli Lilly
