= Eli Underwood =

American baseball player

- Outfielder
- Born: January 29, 1907; Marion, Alabama, U.S.
- Died: 2000 (aged 92–93); Aurora, Colorado, U.S.

Negro league baseball debut
- 1937, for the Detroit Stars

Last appearance
- 1937, for the Detroit Stars
- Stats at Baseball Reference

Teams
- Detroit Stars (1937)

Eli McKinley Underwood (January 29, 1907 – October 2000) was an American Negro league outfielder in the 1930s.

A native of Marion, Alabama, Underwood played for the Detroit Stars in 1937. In 20 recorded games, he posted ten hits with a home run in 68 plate appearances. Underwood died in Aurora, Colorado in 2000 at age 93.
