= Eli Nichols =

American farmer, lawyer, and abolitionist (1799–1871)

Eli Nichols (1799 - 1871) was a farmer, lawyer, and abolitionist in Ohio. He was involved with the Underground Railroad. He was born in Loudoun County, Virginia, and moved with his family to Newcastle Township, Coshocton County, Ohio. He served in the Ohio legislature. He was a “conductor” on the Underground Railroad. His wife Rachel Nichols wrote passages promoting liberty and also wrote poems. He died on his farm in Walhonding.
