= Theo Redhead =

Grenadian cricketer

Personal information
- Full name: Theophilus Augustus Redhead
- Born: 8 August 1930; St. George's, Grenada
- Died: 27 August 1993 (aged 63); St. George's, Grenada
- Batting: Right-handed
- Bowling: Right-arm fast-medium

Domestic team information
- Years: Team
- 1959–1965: Windward Islands
- 1961–1962: Combined Islands
- Source: CricketArchive, 24 February 2016

Theophilus Augustus "Theo" Redhead (8 August 1930 – 27 August 1993) was a Grenadian cricketer who played for the Windward Islands and Combined Islands in West Indian domestic cricket. He played as a right-arm pace bowler.

Redhead made his first-class debut in December 1959, in what was the inaugural first-class match for the Windward Islands (coming against a touring English team). In England's first innings, he opened the bowling with Frank Mason, and finished with 5/39 from 14.5 overs, including the wickets of Colin Cowdrey, Ken Barrington, and Fred Trueman. England were bowled out for 121, but still went on to win the match by ten wickets. Redhead also played in the Windwards' next first-class fixture, which came in March 1961 against another touring team (organised by E. W. Swanton, and featuring a mixture of English and non-English players). He was again his team's best bowler in the first innings, finishing with 3/58 (including the wicket of former Australian international Ray Lindwall). In October 1961, Redhead participated in the inaugural first-class fixture for the Combined Islands, against British Guiana. His only other first-class appearance came in April 1962, for the Combined Islands against the touring Indians. However, he continued to play for Grenada in inter-island matches into the 1970s.
