= Eli Cross =

Eli Cross may refer to:

- Eli Cross (politician) (born 1957), Canadian politician
- Eli Cross (director) (born 1967), American pornographic film director

== Fictional characters ==
- Eli Cross, in the 1980 US satirical psychological black comedy film The Stunt Man, played by Peter O'Toole

== See also ==
- Cross (surname)
