= Thomas Thomas (abolitionist) =

- Born: 1817; Oxford, Maryland, U.S.
- Died: March 9, 1894; Springfield, Massachusetts, U.S.

Thomas Thomas (1817-March 9, 1894) was an American abolitionist and entrepreneur.

== Life ==
Thomas was born into slavery in Oxford, Maryland to Joseph and Sophia (Giles) Thomas. Beginning at age ten, he was hired out to work as a waiter on steamboats on the Chesapeake River. While working, he reported meeting Frederick Douglass and Henry Highland Garnett. At age 17, he entered negotiations with his enslaver to buy his freedom; a price of $400 was decided, to be paid in installments. Thomas worked additional side jobs in order to raise funds for this goal, and ultimately made enough money after working on steamboats in Mississippi at age 19.

After obtaining his freedom, Thomas lived in New Orleans for a year, working as a servant at the St. Charles Hotel. He then returned to steamboats, working as a steward on the Arkansas and Mississippi Rivers. He later worked as an entrepreneur, buying and selling vegetables and dairy products for a profit.

He was briefly jailed in 1843 in Louisiana, for breaking a law regarding free Blacks entering the state. In 1844, he moved to Springfield, Massachusetts, where his mother and sister both lived. There, he worked at the Hampden House hotel and the Union House. In the late 1840s, he was hired by abolitionist John Brown to work in his wool sorting rooms. He and Brown would arrive early before work and stay late after the end of the work day to discuss abolition and plans to free enslaved people.

In 1850, Thomas worked as the steward of Holyoke's Samoset House. The following year, he became a member of the League of Gileadites, an African-American self-defense group organized in part by John Brown. In 1853, he moved to Springfield, Illinois, where he worked at a hotel across from the office of then-attorney Abraham Lincoln. Thomas returned to Massachusetts in 1855, after the Illinois hotel closed, and promptly joined a group of men planning to go to California to work. Thomas stayed in California for three years, before returning to Illinois.

He had returned to Springfield, Massachusetts by 1862, where he opened a successful saloon and restaurant, which became popular with African-American veterans following the Civil War. In 1866, he co-founded a branch of the Prince Hall Masons in the city. Thomas also was associated with Zion Methodist Church, also known as the Free Church.

Thomas died in Springfield on March 9, 1894.

== Personal life ==
Thomas was married three times. His first wife, Lydia, died around 1837 in Maryland. His second wife, Margaret Williams, whom he married in 1841, had two children, neither of whom survived childhood. His final wife was Martha H. Hall, whom he married in 1843. The couple adopted a daughter, Hattie Belle Simmons. Thomas was known as a great storyteller.
