= Eli Gras =

Spanish musician

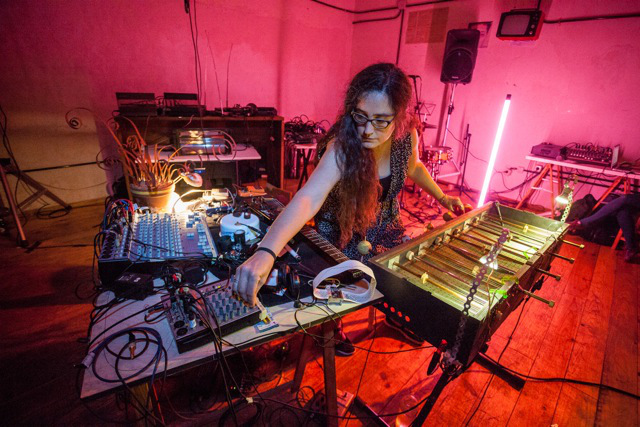

Background information
- Born: Elisabeth Gras Sánchez; January 28, 1971 (age 55); Barcelona, Catalonia, Spain.
- Genres: Experimental, electropop, electronic
- Occupations: Musician; Composer; Writer; Luthier
- Instruments: guitar; bass; keyboards; flute; clarinet; sax; percussion; selfmade instruments; toys
- Years active: 1982–today
- Labels: La Olla Expréss; Esc.Rec.; Ego Twister
- Website: eligras.com

Eli Gras (born 28 January 1971) is a Spanish composer, multi-instrumentalist, illustrator, photographer, writer, and graphic designer. She is the founder of La Olla Expréss, which is a combination of multimedia publishing company and cultural association. She has also collaborated on several children's books and animation films, produced special effects for cinema and advertising, and promoted cultural projects and events.

== Biography ==
Gras was born into a large family in the Gràcia neighborhood of Barcelona, Spain. She was a founding member of the experimental group Etnia (1982–1989) with Juzz S. Ubach, Alain Wergifosse, and Florenci Salesas. Throughout the 1980s, she played with musicians from other fields and genres, including experimental, electropop, minimalism, and others. In the 1990s, she started performing her first solo concerts while continuing to expand her scope of collaborations. In the mid-1990s, she co-founded the Obmuz Trio with Quico Samsó and Alain Wergifosse.

In 2002, she founded La Olla Expréss, a cultural association created to publish books and CDs in atypical formats. Gras has also participated in European experimental music festivals such as Worldtronics, Imaxinasons, Jardines Éfemeros, Experimentaclub, Blurred Edges, Sonar, and NoNoLogic, the last of which she founded in 2007, and for which she is currently director and coordinator. From 2012 to 2016, Gras held several performances at various locations in Spain, France, and The Netherlands, as well as participating in CCCB's Drap-Art-13 festival.

== Musical style ==
Gras's music consists of combining improvisation with composed and structured themes, both instrumental and sung, with an emphasis on words and melodies of strong emotional character. She uses unconventional instruments such as toys, prepared guitars, and other artifacts, as well as conventional instruments such as electric bass, small electronic keyboards, and flutes.

== Literature and other disciplines ==
Gras has enjoyed poetry, writing, and other artistic media since childhood. In 1998 she self-published (republished in 2002 by La Olla Expréss) Cuentos de la Olla Expréss, her first compilation of short stories.That volume was followed by Mis queridos objetos y otras poeprosas (La Olla Expréss, 2002) and Sin espejos (La Olla Expréss, 2006). She has made appearances in collective readings with the poet and musician Cèlia Sànchez-Mústich. She has also been a radio presenter on the "Mans I mànigues" section of the iCat Cabaret Electric program, hosted by Montse Virgili. Other artistic fields she has worked in include graphic design, illustration, packaging, and photography.

== Works ==
Apart from her solo work, Eli Gras is a former member of several groups such as Colofonia, Kaimos, The Showers Sisters with Adele Madau, Obmuz, Etnia, Ome Acustic and, together with Florenci Salesas, Motor Combo. She is currently a part member of the Laptopless Orchestra.

=== Solo works ===
- 2002 – Baranda LP (La Olla Expréss, Barcelona)
- 2016 – Xylotheque LP (La Olla Expréss, Barcelona)
- 2018 – Grass Velvet LP (Esc. Rec. Netherlands)
- 2018 – Tasmanian Robinet EP (La Olla Expréss, Barcelona)
- 2019 – Museum of the Dry Bugs Cassette tape + special object (Gagarin Records, Cologne)

=== Motor Combo ===
- 2003 – El avión Single (La Olla Expréss, Barcelona)
- 2012 – Polo LP (La Olla Expréss, Barcelona)

=== Collaborations ===
- 1998 – Obmuz Band (Dude Tapes, Barcelona).
- 1999 – Deep Gray Organics (Alain Wergifosse, Geometrik Records, Madrid).
- 2009 – Baby Elephant Walk (Ego Twister Records, Angers).
- 2010 – Calixto, song for Ego Twister Party Ruiners.
- 2010 – Calixto, song for Music for Toys 3 (Ego Twister Records, Angers).
- 2013 – Yan Lemonnier (Ego Twister Records, Angers).
- 2013 – Reedición de Obmuz Band (Dude Tapes, Barcelona).
- 2014 – Crek-Walters-Gras-Caicedo. Juan Matos Capote. (El Generador).
- 2015 – Duplicat (Pelayo Arrizabala & Eli Gras) (La Olla Expréss, Barcelona).
- 2015 – Sound and Visual Walk (Circular Strings Sequencer).

=== Books ===
- 2006 – Cuentos de La Olla Expréss (La Olla Expréss)
- 2013 – Queridos Objetos y Otras Poeprosas (La Olla Expréss)
- 2013 – Sin Espejos (La Olla Expréss)

=== Performances, Residences ===
- 2012 – ''l'oscil·lar'' and Saló Sonor, at Associació Priorat Centre d'Art (Priorat, Spain)
- 2014 – Saló Sonor, with Mar Morey, at L'Estruch Centre D'art" (Sabadell, Spain)
- 2015 – Peeled Piano, at Champs des Possibles, (Ferme de la Mhotte, France)
- 2015 – De Perifeer, at (Deventer, the Netherlands)
- 2016 – Xylotheque at WORM (Rotterdam, the Netherlands)
- 2016 – Conference at Universidad de Jaén (Jaén, Spain)
- 2016 – Furniture Talk! at ELISAVA (Barcelona, Spain)
