= Eli F. Peckumn =

American football player and coach (1873–1953)

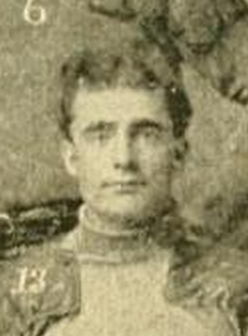
- Peckumn pictured in the 1901 Northwestern football team photo

Biographical details
- Born: January 29, 1873; Iowa, U.S.
- Died: January 17, 1953 (aged 79); Los Angeles County, California, U.S.

Playing career
- 1900: Northwestern
- 1902–1903: Northwestern

Coaching career (HC unless noted)
- 1904: Morningside

Head coaching record
- Overall: 0–4–3

Eli Franklin Peckumn (January 29, 1873 – January 17, 1953) was an American college football player and coach. He served as the head football coach at Morningside College in 1904, compiling a record of 0–4–3. Peckumn played at Northwestern University, lettering in 1900, 1902, and 1903.

== Head coaching record ==
Year	Team	Overall	Conference	Standing	Bowl/playoffs
Morningside (Independent) (1904)
1904	Morningside	0–4–3			
Morningside:		0–4–3			
Total:		0–4–3			
