= Eli Chesen =

American artist

Eli Sagan Chesen (born May 18, 1944, died October 25, 2023) was a U.S. psychiatrist, author and artist.

Eli S. Chesen

Chesen grew up in Sioux City, IA, and lived his life crisscrossing vocational and avocational boundaries. His diverse life experience included his having practiced medicine and having plotted out, for David Frost, the interview strategy for the original Nixon/Frost Interviews.

== Psychiatry ==
Chesen has practiced medicine for 40 years, specializing in pharmacological psychiatry. He currently practices psychiatry in Lincoln, Nebraska.

== Art ==
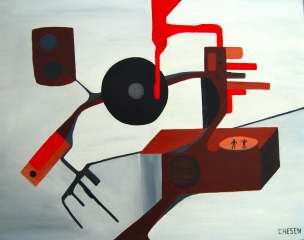
"Hi Fi 1964", Eli S. Chesen

Chesen started painting 50 years ago, when he was 15.

His knowledge of chemistry, physiology and physics infiltrate his creative activities.

Chesen's art work is schematic, figurative, deconstructive, technological, modernist and abstract.

He sometimes attaches electronic or hardware objects, such as water faucets, to his oils as with "Duchamp Meets Home Depot", an homage to Marcel Duchamp’s sea changing work with plumbing art.

He won the first of two juried art competitions, in 1971, for his abstract oil, "Hi Fi 1964".

In some of his most recent work, Chesen has taken 1953 Buick automobile hoods and 'deconstructed' them into stunning pieces of original sculpture.

== Author ==
Chesen has authored several books including: Religion May Be Hazardous to Your Health (1972), President Nixon’s Psychiatric Profile (1973), and The Fitness Compulsion (1988). His book Religion May Be Hazardous to Your Health was serialized by the New York Times Sunday Magazine.

Currently he is a contributing author to Prairie Fire magazine, a monthly regional journal of public policy and the arts, based in Lincoln, Nebraska.

Eli Chesen has been serialized in The New York Times Sunday Magazine and has been written up in Esquire, Newsweek and Le Monde. Chesen's Nixon book was a cover story in Parade Magazine in 1975. He has been featured on Donahue, The CBS Evening News, Regis, and ABC's Good Morning America.

Quoting John Dean, III, former counsel to President Nixon and primary mover in the "Watergate" scandal: “Importantly, Eli Chesen, with whom I have discussed Nixon over many years because of his 1974 book, President Nixon's Psychiatric Profile, had a number of off-the-record conversations with Reston Jr., which appear to me to have provided David Frost with a key to pressing Nixon to actually provide something of value during the interviews. I was curious about Eli's take on the Frost/Nixon film. Moreover, knowing of Eli's extensive off-the-record dealings with Reston, I was interested in his feelings about Reston's emerging as a central character in the film and play. I was surprised by several of Eli’s responses – Chesen, practices psychiatry in Lincoln, Nebraska. Given his profession, I am never surprised by his keen perception of others. He is politically and culturally-sophisticated, and smart as a whip.”

== Inventions ==
Chesen has produced several energy innovations such as transformerless low voltage, halogen light fixtures and an air conditioner (refrigerant mediated) swimming pool heater, which takes waste air conditioner heat and transfers it into the family swimming pool providing, in some latitudes, 100% of desirable pool heating at an energy cost of zero. The crude prototype of this device appeared in Popular Science Magazine in 1978 and has since been improved and operates automatically in its current incarnation.

Subsequent to the Popular Science article Chesen was granted $10,000 from the United States Department of Energy to perfect the device. One version of Chesen's pool heating devices incorporates principles of mammalian physiology (known as a counter-current multiplier system).
