= Eli Jones (disambiguation) =

Eli Jones (1850–1933) was an American medical doctor.

Eli Jones may also refer to:

- Eli Jones (academic), American academic and entrepreneur
- Eli Jones Henkle (1828–1893), American politician and medical doctor
- Eli Jones (Quaker) (1807–1890), American Quaker preacher
- Eli Stanley Jones (1884–1973), American Methodist Christian missionary, theologian, and author

== See also ==
- Eli and Sybil Jones House
