= Eli Sostre =

American R&B singer, producer, and songwriter

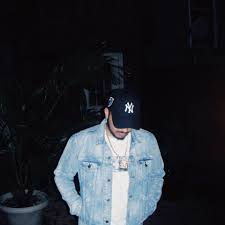

Eli Sostre is an American R&B singer, producer, and songwriter, born and raised in Brooklyn, New York at the Marcy Houses, the same complex of rapper and media mogul, Jay-Z.

Sostre has released five full-length albums, Still up All Night (2016), Sleep is for The Weak (2017), Eros (2019), Emori (2020), and SOS (2022), as well as one EP Vibe God Collection, Vol. 1 (2019). His music has gotten press support from the likes of Fader, XXL, and Complex. His 2018 single, "Drama," was released in partnership with the alcohol brand Hennesey. Sostre has collaborated with Grammy award-winning producer Vinylz, Soriano, and Johan Lenox.

Sostre has performed in venues across the US, including ComplexCon, where he shared the stage with Gucci Mane, Young Thug, DJ Khaled and others. As part of this event, Japanese artist Takashi Murakami designed and released a set of 550 hand-numbered vinyl editions, including Sostre's song "Vibe With" in addition to songs by SZA, Kid Cudi, N.E.R.D., and Skrillex, among others.
