= Eli Thompson =

Eli Thompson may refer to:

- Eli "Lucky" Thompson (1924–2005), American jazz tenor and soprano saxophonist
- Eli Thompson Fryer (1878–1963), American Marine Corps brigadier general
- Eli Thompson (skydiver) (1973–2009), American skydiver and BASE jumper

== Fictional characters ==
- Eli Thompson, in the US period crime drama TV series Boardwalk Empire, played by Shea Whigham and, in flashbacks in season 5, Ryan Dinning and Oakes Fegley
