= Eli Larsen =

Danish footballer (1909-1978)

Personal information
- Date of birth: 31 January 1909
- Date of death: 19 July 1978 (aged 69)

International career
Years	Team	Apps	(Gls)
1933–1934	Denmark	4	(0)

Eli Larsen (31 January 1909 – 19 July 1978) was a Danish footballer. He played in four matches for the Denmark national football team from 1933 to 1934.
