= Um, Jennifer? =

American indie rock band

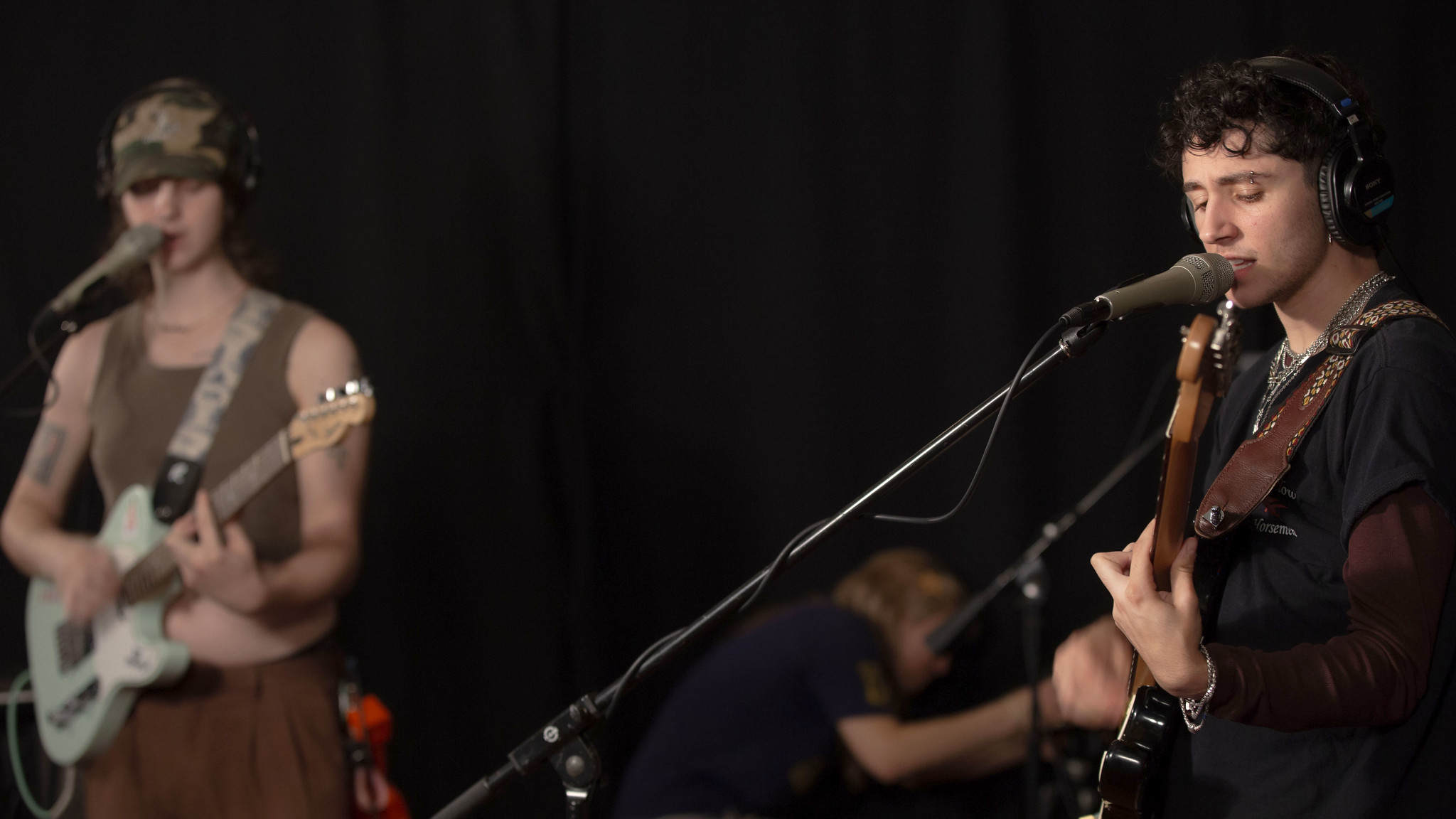
- Um, Jennifer? at WFUV in 2024

Background information
- Origin: New York City, New York, U.S.
- Genres: Punk rock; indie pop
- Works: The Girl Class EP (2024) Um Comma Jennifer Question Mark (2025) Dirty Twice (2026)
- Years active: 2023–present
- Label: Final Girl
- Members: Fig Regan; Eli Scarpati
- Website: umjennifer.bandcamp.com

Um, Jennifer? is an American indie rock duo consisting of Fig Regan and Eli Scarpati, based in Brooklyn, New York. Regan met Scarpati, then a member of indie-pop band Moonkissed, at a party in New York City in 2022; at the time, Regan was working on a solo project and wanted to join a rock band. The pair began writing music together before forming Um, Jennifer? in January 2023. The band takes their name from a feminine deity they worship.

They released their debut single, "Girl Class", in July 2023, a track comprising a phone call in which Regan tells a girl how to be one, and the title track to their April 2024 debut EP The Girl Class EP. They followed this with the single "Went on T" in August 2024, a track about starting testosterone, and then with "Fishy" in October 2024 and "Delancey" and "Old Grimes" in March 2025. The last of these referenced Grimes, though was otherwise unrelated. All four featured on their April 2025 debut album Um Comma Jennifer Question Mark, which was released on Final Girl Records (a limited-release vinyl was produced in partnership with Trans Music Archive). and promoted with a video for album track "So Sick!". A further single, "Stunning", was released in November 2025.

Both members of Um, Jennifer? are transgender and characterize their music as "slut rock". Scarpati briefly studied at The New School. Their music often explores themes related to LGBTQ+ rights, transgender identity, and relationships. The pair reference several influences to their lyrics and music, including Dennis Cooper, Larry Kramer, St. Vincent, The Velvet Underground, Mitski, and The Strokes; Scarpati is additionally influenced by the Great American Songbook and early vocal jazz.

== Members ==
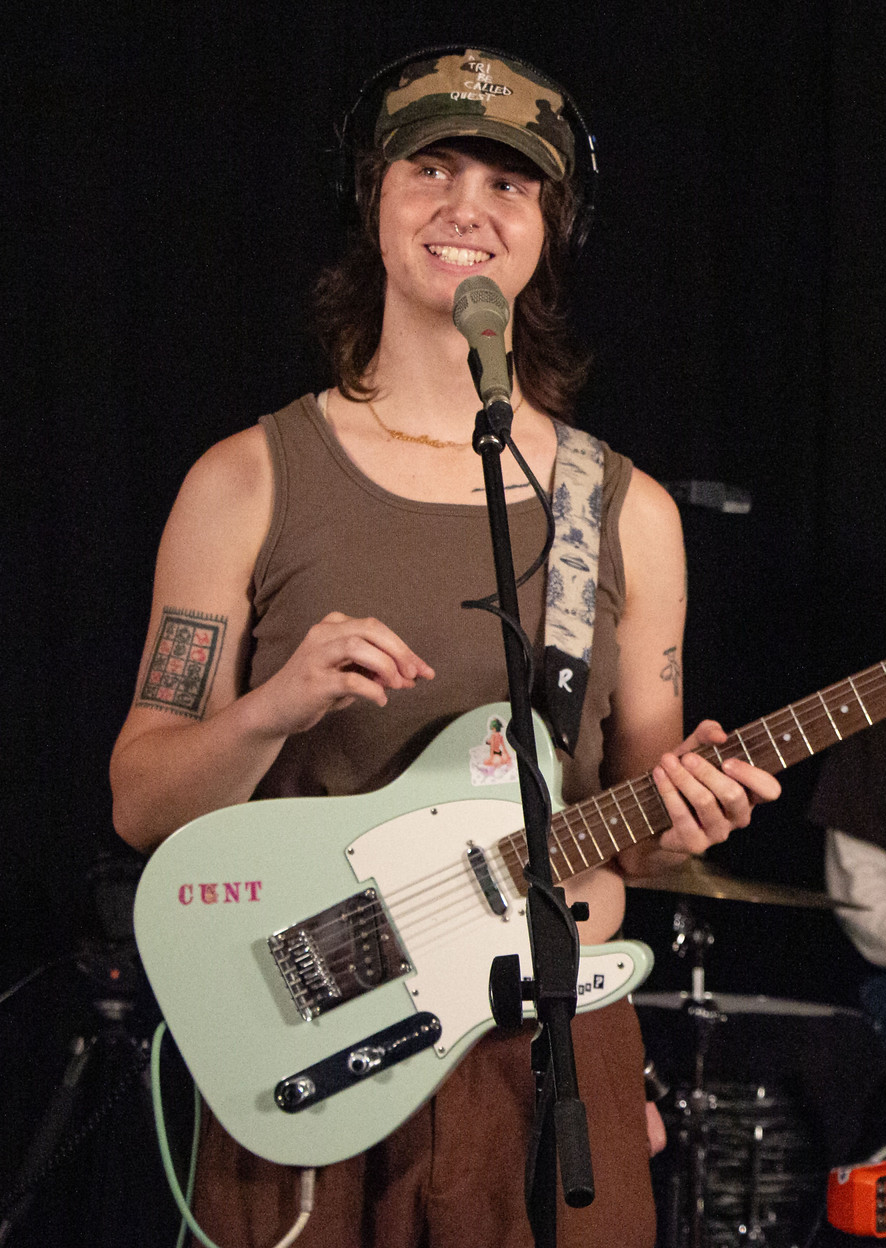
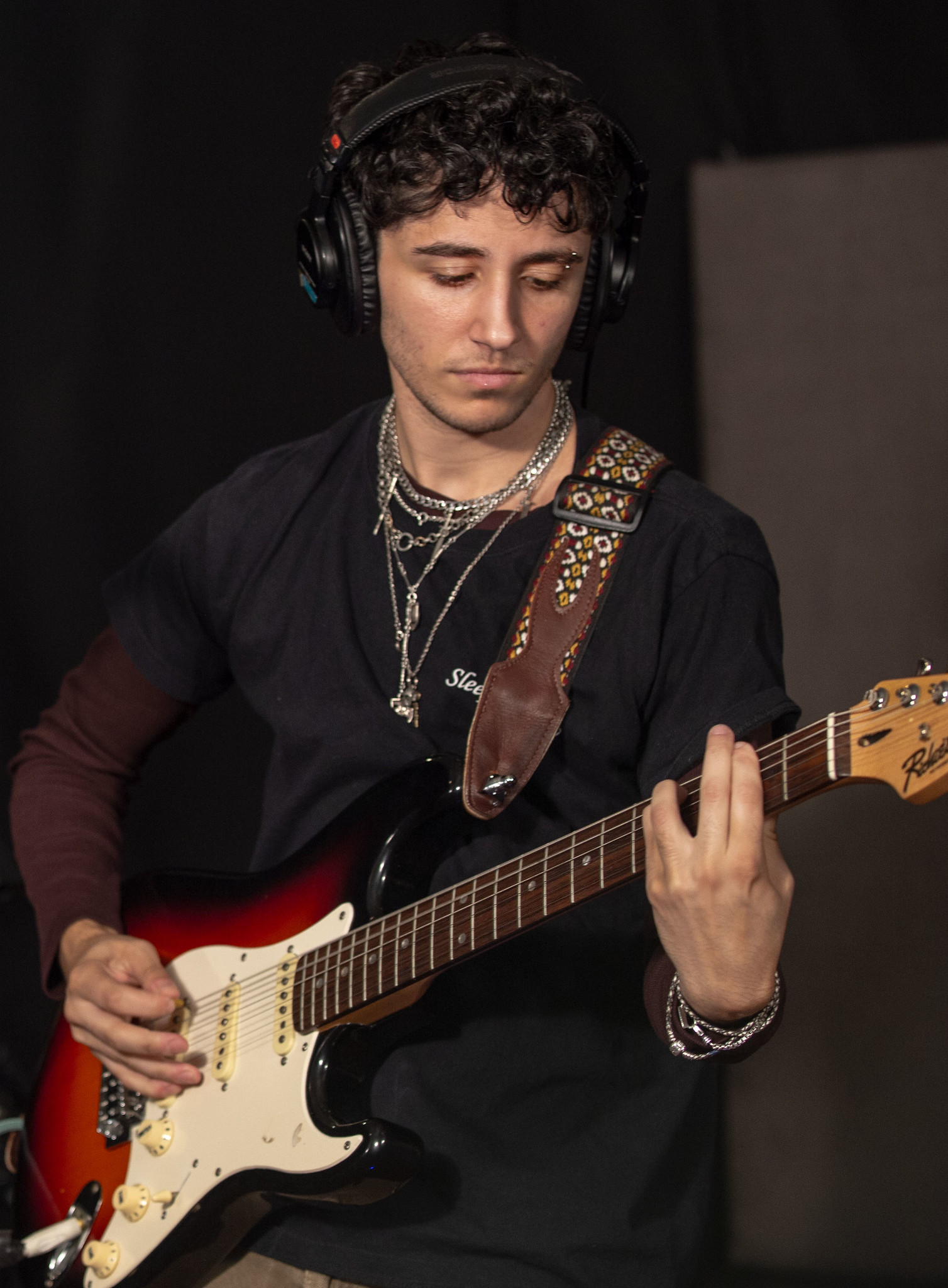
Regan (left) and Scarpati (right), 2024
- Fig Regan – guitar, vocals
- Eli Scarpati – drums, bass, guitar, vocals

== Discography ==
=== Studio albums ===
- Um Comma Jennifer Question Mark (2025)

=== Extended plays ===
- The Girl Class EP (2024)
- Dirty Twice (2026)
