= Frank Mason (cricketer) =

West Indian cricketer

Personal information
- Full name: Frank Odel Mason
- Born: 26 July 1926; Barrouallie, Saint Vincent
- Died: 8 May 2012 (aged 85); Saint Vincent
- Batting: Right-handed
- Bowling: Right-arm fast

Domestic team information
- Years: Team
- 1954–1961: Windward Islands
- 1955–1962: Combined Islands
- Source: CricketArchive, 24 February 2016

Frank Odel Mason (26 July 1926 – 8 May 2012) was a Vincentian cricketer who played for the Windward Islands and Combined Islands in West Indian domestic cricket. He played as a right-arm fast bowler.

Mason made his senior debut for the Windward Islands in March 1954, against the touring English team. He also appeared against the touring Australians the following season, although the team's matches at that time did not have first-class status. In December 1959, Mason was selected to captain the Windwards in the team's inaugural first-class match, against England. He opened the bowling with Theo Redhead in the match, and thus had the distinction of bowling the team's first over. Mason also captained the Windwards in their next first-class fixture, against another English team (organised by E. W. Swanton) in March 1961. His third and final first-class appearance came for the Combined Islands, against the touring Indians in April 1962. Aged 35, Mason took career-best figures in the Indians' first innings (5/32 from 13.5 overs), and finished with eight wickets for the match. His victims included four top-order batsmen – Vijay Mehra, Motganhalli Jaisimha, Dilip Sardesai, and the Nawab of Pataudi (India's captain).

After retiring from playing, Mason remained involved in cricket as an umpire, and also refereed football. He worked as a policeman and as a prison officer, eventually being appointed St. Vincent's superintendent of prisons. Mason died in May 2012, aged 85.
