= Eli Wachtel =

American investment banker

Eli Wachtel is an American financier and investor. He is the co-chief investment officer (CIO) and a founding member of Wachtel Capital Advisors LLC, a hedge fund focused on classical arbitrage and private capital market investments.

== Education ==
Wachtel graduated from the New York Institute of Technology in 1972 with a Bachelor of Science degree.

== Career ==
Prior to founding Wachtel Capital Advisors, Wachtel was a trading partner at Bedford Managing Partners. He subsequently joined The Bear Stearns Companies, Inc. (BSC), where he spent 27 years. He rose to the position of senior managing director and served on the firm's Board of Directors until his departure in August 2008. During his tenure at Bear Stearns, Wachtel oversaw a range of business units. Alongside his energy work, Wachtel led the firm's Strategic Structuring and Transactions (SST) department.

=== Board memberships and philanthropy ===
Wachtel has served on the board of New York Law School, where he served as co-chairman of its investment committee. He was elected to New York Institute of Technology's Board of Trustees in December 2023, having previously served in that role from 2005 to 2013. In 2023, he was awarded an honorary Doctor of Science (Sc.D.) by New York Tech.
