= Eli Janney =

Eli Janney may refer to:

- Eli H. Janney (1831–1912), American inventor of the Janney coupler used in rail transport
- Eli Janney (musician) (fl. 1990s–2020s), American music producer and musician
