= Eli Nacht =

- אלי נכט
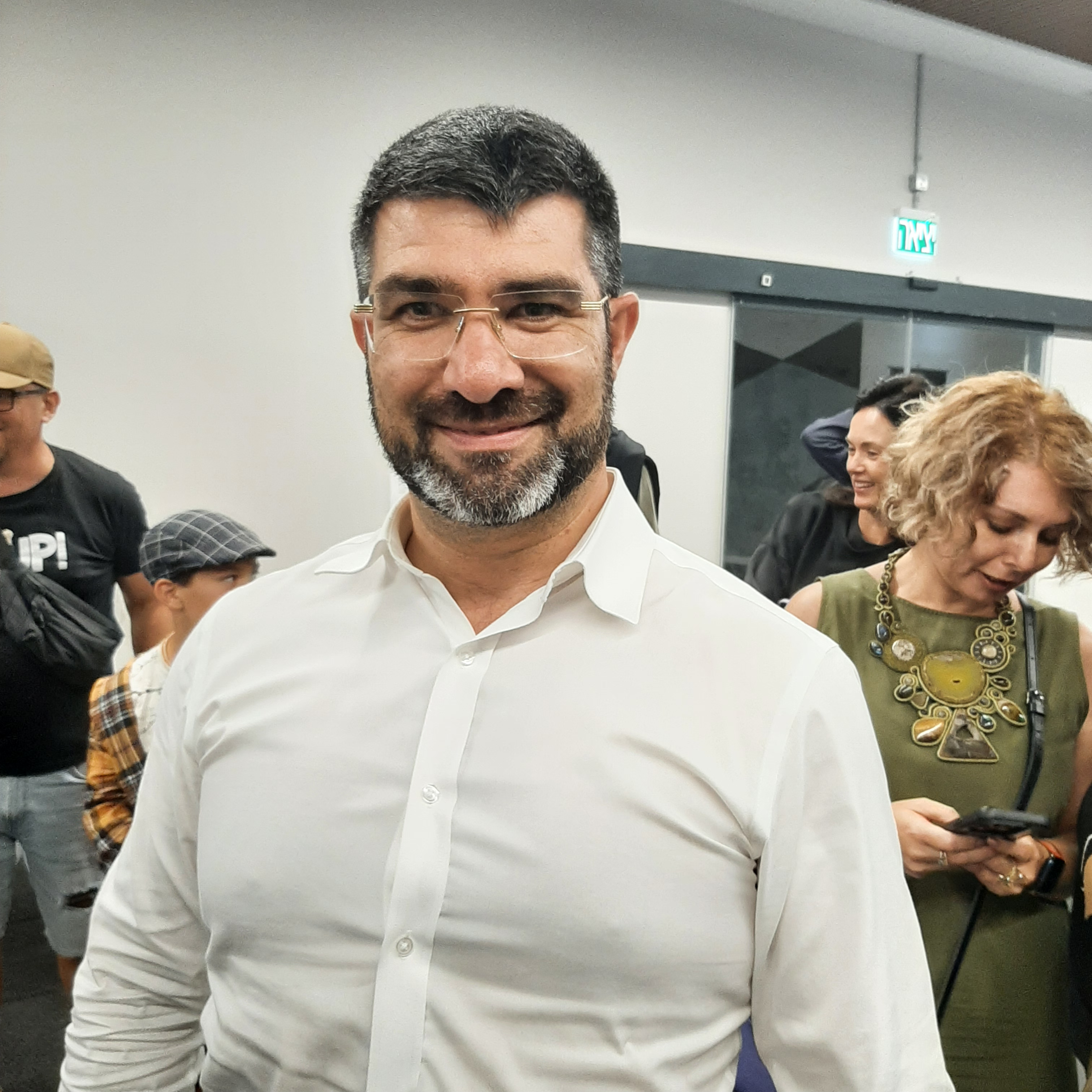
- Visit to the ice arena in Ashdod.
- Deputy: Deputy mayor of Ashdod

Personal details
- Born: 12 October 1983 (age 42) Zhytomyr, Ukrainian SSR, USSR
- Party: Atid Ashdod (Future of Ashdod)
- Spouse: Inna Nacht
- Children: Yonathan Nacht, Ron Nacht, Tali Nacht, Noga Nacht
- Education: TAU (LL.B.) TAU (Master of Political Science)
- Profession: Attorney at law, Politician

Eli Nacht (born October 12, 1983) is an Israeli politician and lawyer, who is serving as the deputy mayor of the city of Ashdod since 2021, having previously served as a councillor of the city of Ashdod.

== Early life and career ==
Eli Nacht was born on October 12, 1983, in Zhytomyr (Ukrainian SSR). Eli Nacht was raised in a family that, in spite of adversity, maintained their traditions. Until the age of 8, he studied at Secondary School No. 19 in Zhytomyr. Eli Nacht's family immigrated to Israel in 1991 and settled in Ashdod. Eli spent a year studying at a Chabad school. In the 8th grade, he joined a class for gifted students at the Johanna Jabotinsky School (named after the wife of Ze’ev Jabotinsky) in Be’er Ya’akov.

During this time, Eli began experiencing health problems, which included surgeries and a stroke. After a year of rehabilitation, he was able to return to school. He was able to resume his studies after a year of recovery. Eli returned to school and continued his therapy at the Levinstein therapy Center in Ra'anana. Didi Almog, his classroom teacher, and her husband, Major General Doron Almog, were instrumental in his education and recuperation. Their assistance enabled Eli Nacht to complete his high school education.

=== Higher Education ===
Eli Nacht was a member of the Southern Command of the IDF Press Corps. Following his service, he enrolled at Tel Aviv University to study economics and law. He obtained bachelor's degree in law before going on to acquire a master's degree in political science with an emphasis on the relationship between politics and the media.

Upon completing his university studies, Eli joined the legal department of the Ministry of Communications. During this time, the minister was Ariel Atias, who was implementing the reform for mobile number portability (MNP), enabling customers to retain their phone numbers when switching service providers.

== Political activity ==
- Eli Nacht tutored and trained ministerial advisers and parliamentary assistants at the Israeli Center for Political Training, which was founded in 2009 and operated until 2021.
- From 2009 to 2013, he served as an advisor to the Deputy Speaker of the Knesset, Hamad Amar.

He was a member of the Central Elections Committee on behalf of Yisrael Beiteinu party prior to the 19th Knesset elections. Although not affiliated with any political party, he was the headquarter chief all Israeli Russian-speaking campaign headquarters during election periods, including: Kulanu (Moshe Kahlon, 20th Knesset elections), New Hope (Gideon Sa’ar, 24th Knesset elections), and National Unity Party (Benny Gantz, 25th Knesset elections).

=== Ashdod Mayoral Elections ===
After Ashdod's 11th municipal elections in 2018, Eli Nacht's list was elected to the municipal government with two mandates. He was appointed the city's deputy mayor in 2021.

In March 2023, Eli Nacht announced his candidacy for mayor of Ashdod, and in September, he unveiled the list of candidates from the Atid Ashdod (Future of Ashdod) movement for the city council elections. The Atid Ashdod list became the largest fraction in the municipality after Shas, winning four mandates in the February 2024 municipal elections. The list received support from Benny Gantz, a candidate for prime minister and leader of Kahol Lavan.

== Development of Ashdod ==
=== Innovation Center ===
After the "Victory" store opened, Deputy Mayor Eli Nacht initiated and realized the project named "Open Valley" Innovation Center in the Ashdod shopping mall. A contract with "Open Valley" was signed on February 12, 2023, and the facility opened on June 15, 2024.

=== Blue Ice Arena ===
On February 28, 2023, an agreement was signed in the office of Deputy Mayor Eli Nacht, in the presence of Israel national team hockey player and coach Evgeny Gusin, with the owner of the "Ashdod al Yam" shopping center for the construction of the Blue Ice Arena. Another project that was initiated and realized by Eli Nacht. The arena was opened on June 9, 2024.

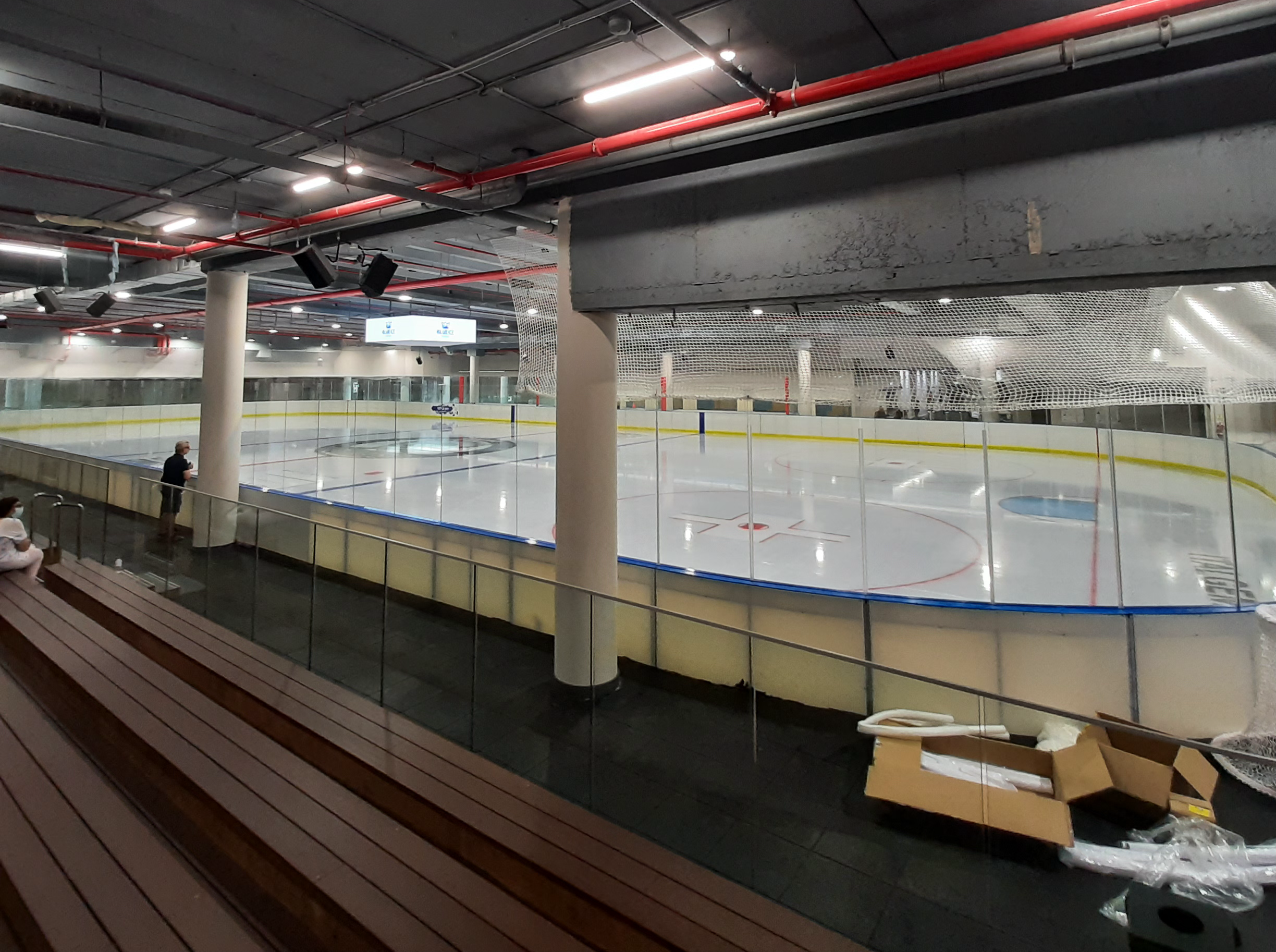
Blue Ice Arena. Ice Rink

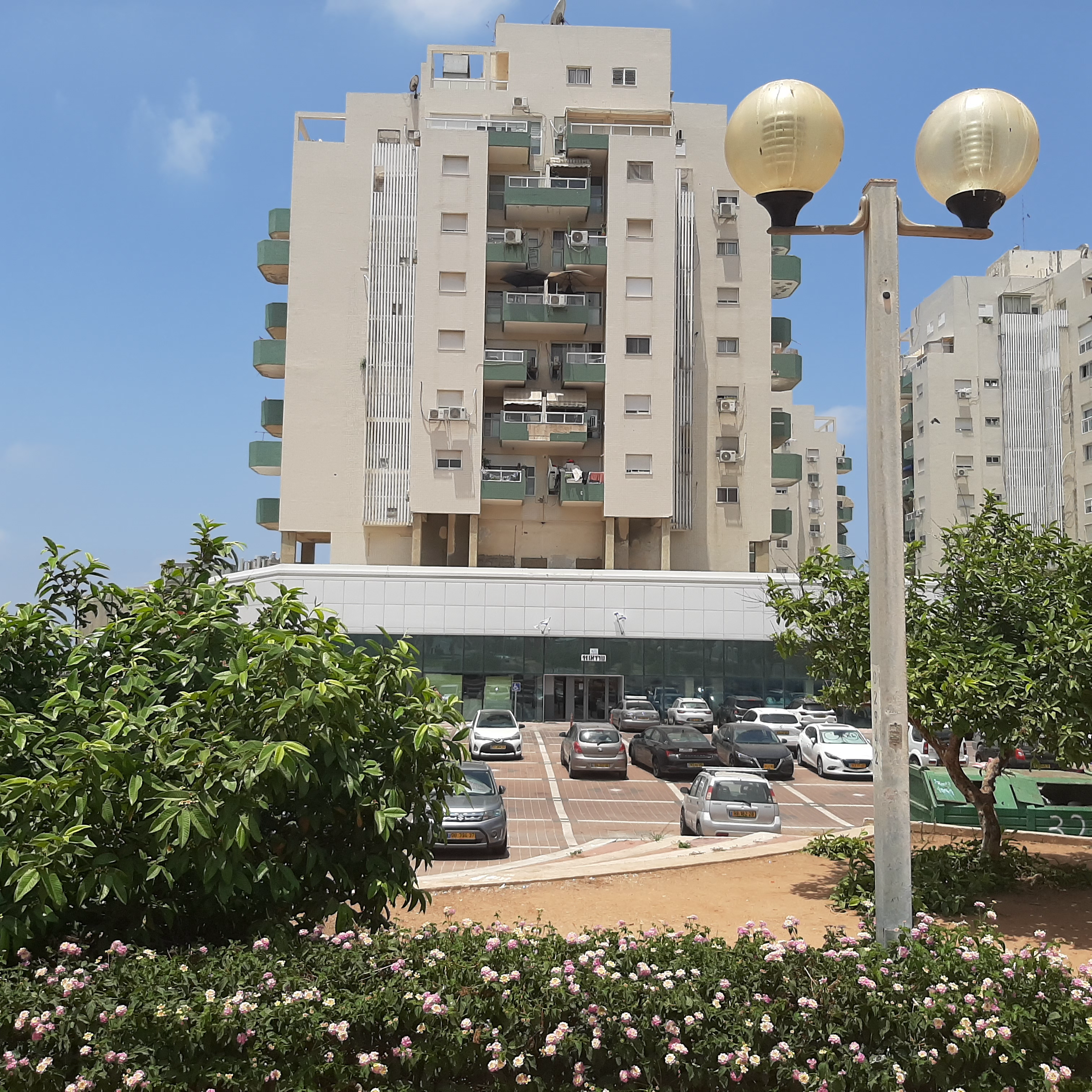
Blue Ice Arena. Facade

On December 12 and 13, 2024, a gala concert titled "Stars on Ice" took place, initiated by Eli Nacht, showcasing Israel's premier figure skaters. The recently concluded Israeli Figure Skating Championship, held at the Ice Peaks Arena, showcased its winners among the participants. At the conclusion of the performance, the skaters presented a special number in honor of the hostages held in Gaza.

=== Holmes Place Country Club ===
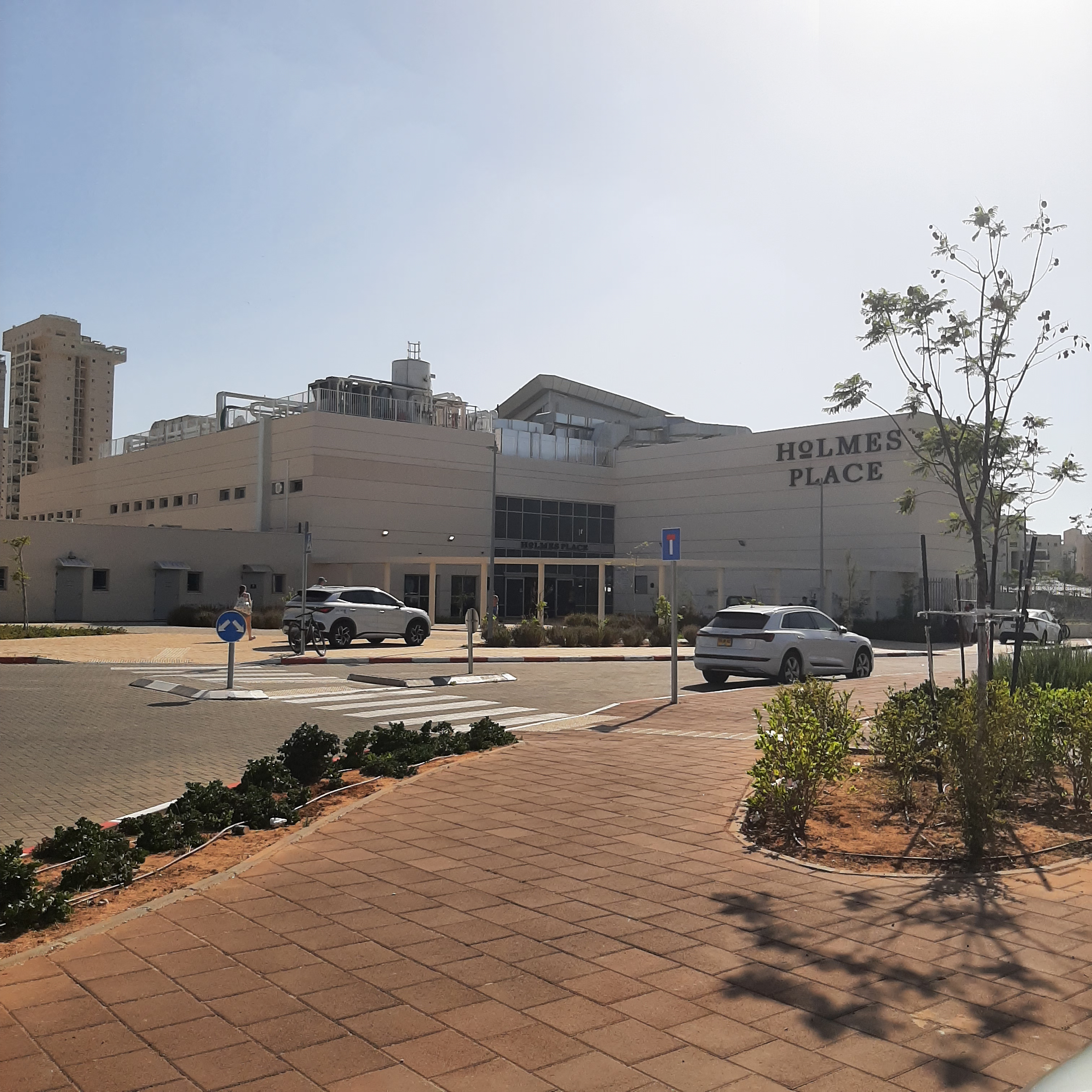
Country Club. Holmes Place Family

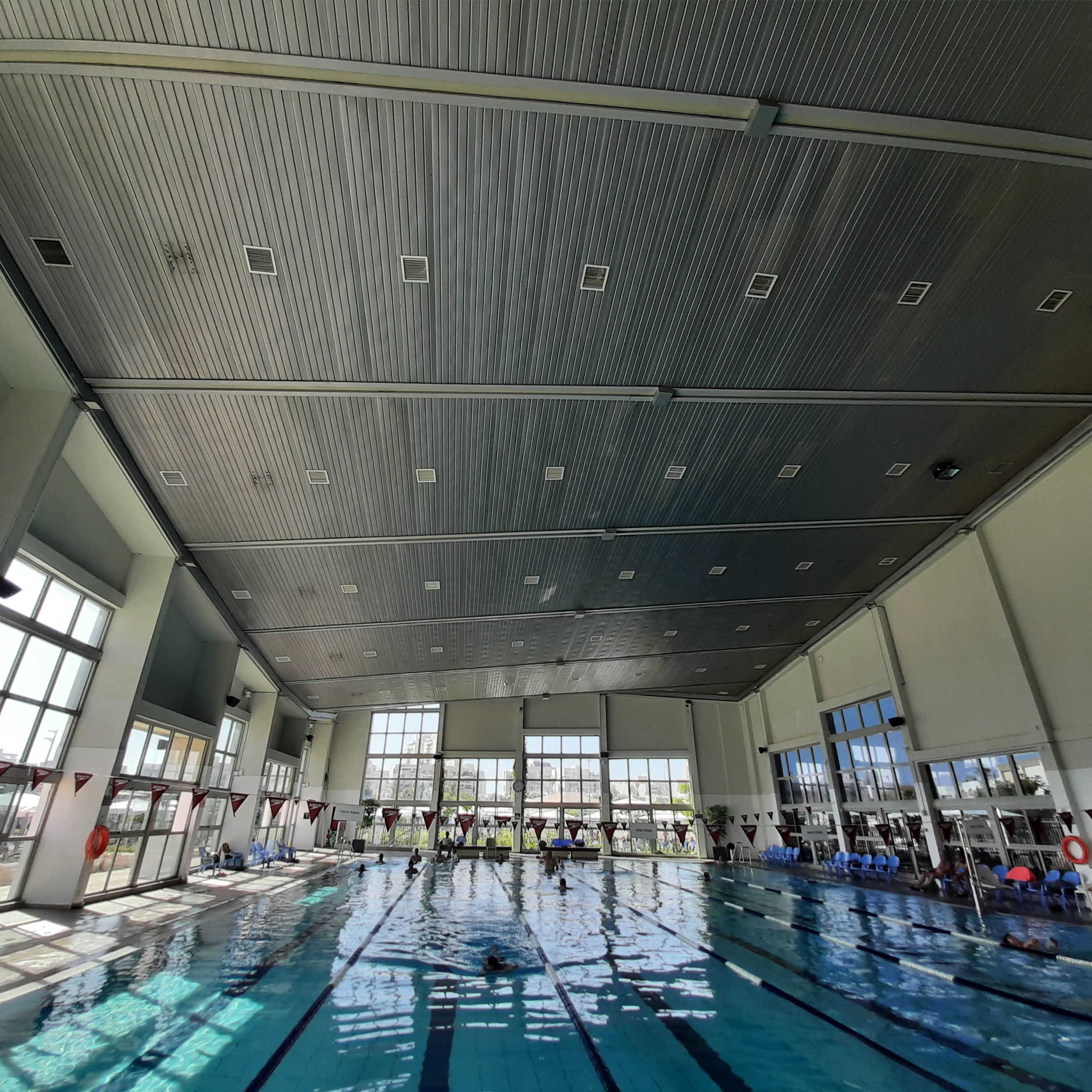
Country Club. Holmes Place Family. Indoor pool

Although there had been attempts to construct a country club for over 20 years, but eventually was successfully finish constructed during Eli Nacht's term while serving as the head of municipal economical company of Ashdod. Holmes Palace Country Club was opened on June 19, 2024.

== Israel Empowerment Lobby ==
Israel Empowerment Lobby (IEL) is an organization founded by Eli Nacht and supported by Knesset members, which, together city mayors, businesspeople, high-ranking officials, and diplomats, promotes better mutual understanding between Israel and the Christian world, ensuring broader support for Israel through special events and joint initiatives. As part of the organization's work, Israeli delegations have met with representatives of the heads of various states, such as South Korea, China, Azerbaijan, the United States, Canada, and others.

=== Solidarity with Israel ===
In March 2024, Eli Nacht hosted a delegation from Duisburg in Ashdod headed by Mona Neubaur, Deputy Minister-President of North Rhine-Westphalia and State Minister for Economics, Industry, Climate Protection and Energy. This was an act of solidarity with Israel after the October 7 attacks and subsequent Gaza war.

== Public activities ==
In May 2015, The Ukrainian government awarded Eli Nacht the Ivan Sirko Order, 3rd degree for boosting Israel-Ukraine relations. He supported sports, orphanages, and disabled homes, organized a rally with Dnipro Chief Rabbi Shmuel Kaminezki against terrorism during 'Operation Protective Edge', and more.

In 2016, Eli Nacht began representing Israel in the Human Rights Commission.

Minister of Construction and Housing Ze'ev Elkin created a state commission in 2022 to set public housing requirements (Hebrew: דיור ציבורי בישראל). Aviad Hacohen was appointed chairman of the commission, and Eli Nacht was appointed as the public representative and deputy chairman of the commission.

=== Sports and other organizations ===
In 2021, Eli Nacht became the Vice President of the Israeli Chess Federation. In Israel he also founded the Open KVN League (Club of the Funny and Inventive). From 2009 to 2018, he served as the Chairman of the Israeli Youth Association.

== Board of Directors of Israeli Museums ==
Under the 1983 law, Israel's Minister of Culture and Sports appoints the Board of Directors of Israeli Museums - Museum Staff (Hebrew: מועצת המוזיאונים), consisting of 21 members. Three of them represent city governments. Eli Nacht became a member of Israel's Museum Staff on December 4, 2024.

== Authored books ==
Eli Nacht has written several books:

- Attorney Eli Nacht presented his book ''Breaking Stereotypes'' on October 31, 2016, at the Moscow International Conference on Combating Anti-Semitism — “Protect the Future''. In order to overcome religious alienation and bring nations together, the book examines the experience of public diplomacy and the efforts of civil society organizations.
- On August 8, 2023, he unveiled his book ''HazonNacht'' (Hebrew: חזונכט). The opening chapter is a personal narrative, in which Eli Nacht reveals his journey and the motivations behind his decision to pursue a career in politics. The upcoming chapters explore the possible future of Ashdod.

== Personal life ==
Eli Nacht is married. His wife, Inna Nacht, is a lawyer, and they have four children: Yonatan, Ron, Tali, and Noga.
