= Eli Kintisch =

American science journalist

- Employer: George Washington University School of Media and Public Affairs
- Website: https://www.elikintisch.com/

Eli Kintisch is an American science journalist. He began writing for Science in 2005. Since 2024, he has worked at the George Washington University School of Media and Public Affairs (SMPA).

== Career ==
His work focuses on policy news for Science with an emphasis on climate and energy research. Some of his top stories include the breaking story of President Barack Obama's science adviser, John Holdren. Kintisch's work has appeared in The Washington Post, Slate, Discover, MIT Technology Review, The Daily Beast. In 2009, he was a Kavli fellow. He has been invited to speak at Columbia University, the National Center for Atmospheric Research, the American Association for the Advancement of Science, and among many others. Kintisch's first article for Hakai Magazine was published in 2016.

== Books ==
In 2010 he published Hack the Planet: Science's Best Hope or Worst Nightmare for Averting Climate Catastrophe about climate change and the potential impacts of geoengineering. The book was given a starred review by Publishers Weekly which claimed it to be a "fascinating wake-up call...engaged but balanced."

== Awards and honors ==
In 2005 he won the Space Journalism Prize for articles he wrote about private spaceflight.
