= Eli Dodson =

American politician and Confederate officer (1828–1921)

Eli Dodson (May 22, 1828 – 1921) was a lawyer, Confederate Army officer, state legislator, and judge in Arkansas. He served as a captain and a colonel during the American Civil War.

== Life ==
Dodson was born in Spencer, Tennessee. One of his wives was named Cantrell.

In 1862 he represented Martin County and Searcy County in the Arkansas Senate. He led the 14th Arkansas Infantry and was severely wounded in the hip in the Battle of Pea Ridge.

Dodson settled in Cooke County, Texas in 1870 before returning to Arkansas in 1885.

== See also ==
- Marion County, Arkansas
