= Fit for Rivals =

American rock band

Fit For Rivals
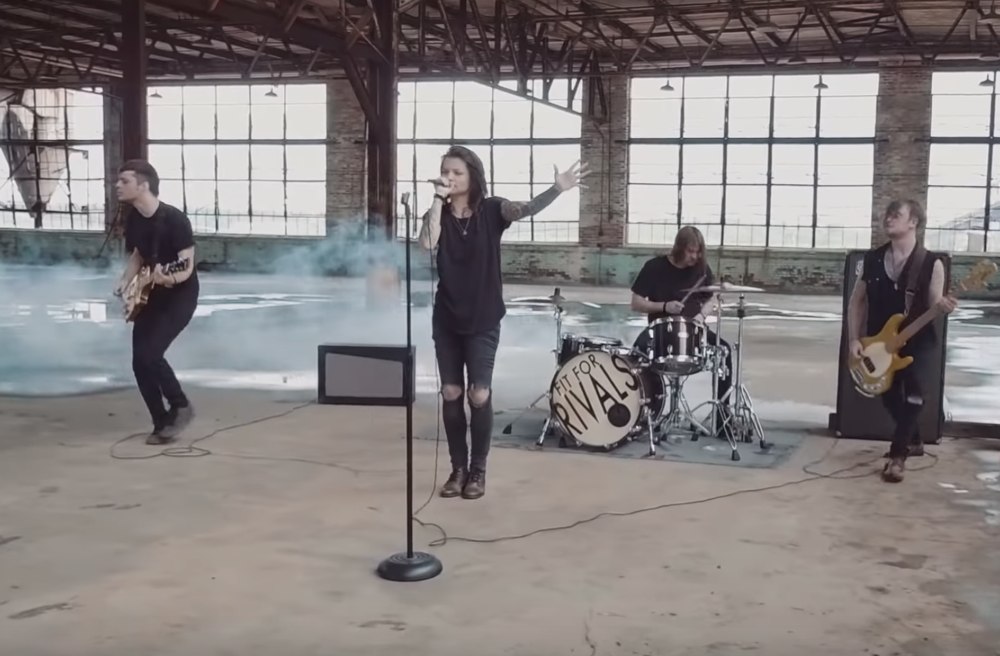
- Fit For Rivals

Background information
- Origin: Jacksonville, Florida, United States
- Genres: alternative rock; pop punk; hard rock; emo
- Years active: 2009-present
- Label: Freak Machine Records
- Members: Renee Phoenix; Thomas Amason; Dorman Pantfoeder; Rufino Lomboy
- Past members: Eli Clark; John Hartman; Benjamin Nelson
- Website: fitforrivals.com

Fit for Rivals' is an American rock band that originated in Jacksonville, Florida. Fit for Rivals is an American rock band that originated in Jacksonville, Florida. The band's core members are songwriter/vocalist Renée Phoenix and songwriter/guitarist Thomas Amason. The band released their debut album Steady Damage on July 9, 2009, followed by Freak Machine on September 2, 2016. In 2025, the band returned with a lo-fi reimagining of Steady Damage, revisiting their debut with a fresh sonic perspective.

== History ==
Fit for Rivals formed in 2009 when Reneé Phoenix met Thomas Amason while looking for a new guitarist for her band The Explicits. The album Steady Damage by Fit For Rivals features excerpts of Phoenix's songs from her first album, The Explicits.

=== Steady Damage (2009) ===
In 2009, Fit for Rivals released their debut EP Was That Our Youth?. Later in the year, the band began recording their debut studio album, Steady Damage, which was self-released on July 18, 2009. It spawned the singles "Crash" and "Damage" and music videos were recorded for both. The track "Crash" has notably been used as a theme song for WWE's Over the Limit pay-per-view and was featured in multiple films and television programs, including Legendary.

=== Freak Machine (2015–2019) ===
The band released their second EP Sugar on July 17, 2015 and consists of 4 tracks: "Special Kind of Crazy", "Light that Shines", "Freak Machine" and "Hit Me". A music video for "Hit Me" was released on August 27, 2014. A fan music video for "Freak Machine" was posted on their YouTube channel on November 11, 2014.

After the release of Sugar, Fit for Rivals began working on their second studio album entitled Freak Machine. Freak Machine was released on September 2, 2016 and was produced by Thomas Amason.

During this time, Fit for Rivals toured extensively in support of Freak Machine and their primary single "Novocain," which received national radio airplay and consistent rotation on Sirius XM Octane. The band toured with I Prevail, Halestorm, Flyleaf, Framing Hanley, Hoobastank, and Icon for Hire, among others, and were added to Revolver's Hottest Chicks in Rock Tour, while also appearing at major rock festivals including Vans Warped Tour, Riot Fest, Rockville, Summerfest, and Welcome to Rockville.

=== Freak Machine Records (2020) ===
In 2020, Renee Phoenix and Thomas Amason started Freak Machine Records, a rock label.

=== B-Sides and Oddities (2020) ===
Through the year 2020, Fit For Rivals released the singles, "No Way In Hell", "Fake", "Tight Rope" and "Window" as part of their B Sides & Oddities EP.

=== "Wake The Dead" and "Secret" (2022) ===
In 2022, Fit For Rivals released the singles, "Wake The Dead" and "Secret".

=== "Bad Bitch Supreme" featuring GRLwood (2023) ===
In 2023, Fit For Rivals released the single, "Bad Bitch Supreme" featuring GRLwood.

=== Steady Damage (Lo-Fi) (2025) ===
In 2025, the band returned with a lo-fi reimagining of Steady Damage, revisiting their debut with a fresh sonic perspective.

== Musical style ==
Fit for Rivals has been described as rock, punk rock and pop punk. Reneé Phoenix's "raspy" and "gritty" vocal style is compared to that of Joan Jett, whom she says she admires, and Brody Dalle. Their EP Sugar has a bit of a throwback sound, as described in New Noise Magazine.

== Members ==
Current members

- Reneé Phoenix – lead vocals, rhythm guitar (2009–present)
- Thomas Amason – rhythm guitar, backing vocals, keyboards (2009–present)
- Dorman Pantfoeder – drums (2009–present)
- Rufino Lomboy – lead guitar (2015–present)

Former members

- Eli Clark – bass, backing vocals
- John Hartman – drums
- Benjamin Nelson – drums

== Associated acts ==
- Reneé Phoenix
- The Explicits
- The Red Jumpsuit Apparatus
- Love Arcade

== Discography ==
=== Albums ===
- Steady Damage (2009)
- Freak Machine (2016)
- Steady Damage (Lo-Fi) (2025)

=== EPs ===
- Was That Our Youth? (2009)
- Sugar (2015)
- B Sides and Oddities (2020)

=== Singles ===
- Wake The Dead (2022)
- Secret (2022)
- Bad Bitch Supreme (2023)

=== Music videos ===
Year	Name
2009	"Crash"
2009	"Damage"
2014	"Hit Me"
2016	"Novocain"
2022	"Damage" 4k, SFW Version
2022	"Wake The Dead"
