= Eli T. =

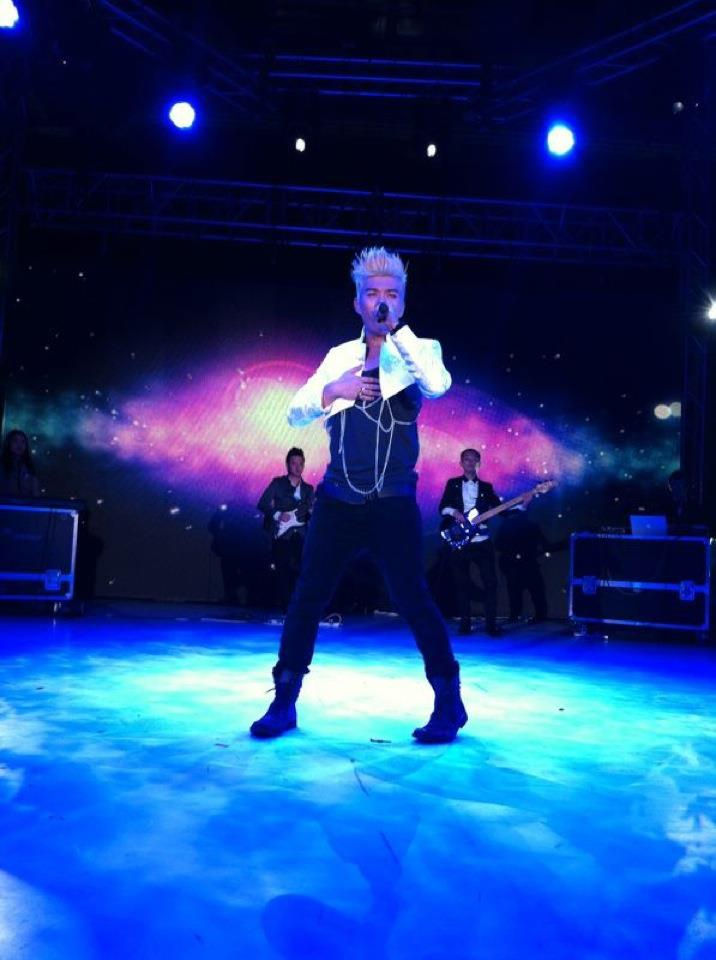
- Eli T. Live at Men's Fashion Week Asia, 2012

Background information
- Born: 10 July 1982 (age 44); Singapore, Singapore
- Origin: Toronto, Ontario, Canada
- Genres: Electropop, R&B
- Occupation: Artist
- Years active: 2006–present
- Label: Assassins Records
- Website: Official website

Eli T. is a Singaporean electropop artist. He is also an established producer, arranger and singer-songwriter who has worked for Chynahouse Recordings (EMI Asia) earlier in his career.

In 2012, he released his debut album, 'Revolt', with Assassins Records, a subsidiary of a Singaporean media group, Assassins Pte. Ltd.

== Early career ==
Eli T. also made his theatre-stage debut in Singapore's hit summer play, Beauty Kings. Written by veteran entertainer Dick Lee, Eli was cast as the "himbo" part-time model, "Don" and played the role throughout the 15-show run. Eli T. was also cast for an episode in the second season of hit TV-series "Point of Entry". The show is filmed and broadcast by Singapore's television station, Mediacorp.

== Music career ==
Eli T. worked in EMI and produced tracks for Disney, Wang Lee Hom, Will Pan and The Gorillaz. Attempting to explore how music could be used for education, Eli left the label and started his production company, Zai Studios, in 2007. And in late 2009, Eli had his first major hit song.

Eli T. launched his debut album, Revolt, on 11 March, 2012 in conjunction with the Mosaic Music Festival, and has since performed for the closing show at both Men's Fashion Week Asia and The Singapore Arts Festival. For Revolt, Eli T. was nominated for Best Singer/Songwriter and Best Solo Artist at the Artists in Music Awards 2012 held at Hollywood. He was also nominated for Best Electronic Artiste at the Ontario New Music Awards 2012 and one award for Best Electronic Artist at the Toronto Independent Music Awards 2012.

The album 'Revolt', led to The Revolt Tour, which was mainly planned around the international festivals that Eli T. had been invited to perform at. The tour will be making stops in Singapore, New Zealand, Canada and the United States of America over the year 2012.

In 2012, Eli T. launched the label, Assassins Records.

== Awards and nominations ==
| Year | Organisation | Category | Nominated work | Result | Ref |
|---|---|---|---|---|---|
| 2012 | Artists in Music Award 2012 | Best Solo Artist | | Nominated | |
| 2012 | Artists in Music Award 2012 | Best Singer/Songwriter | | Nominated | |
| 2012 | Ontario New Music Awards 2012 | Best Electronic Artist | | Nominated | |
| 2012 | SingerUniverse Best Vocalist of the Month (August 2012) | Finalist | | Nominated | |
| 2012 | Toronto Independent Music Awards 2012 | Best Electronic Artist | | Nominated | |

== Discography ==
Albums

- Revolt: Released 11 March 2012
1. Intro
2. Dancin' With Fire
3. Hear Me
4. Fallen
5. Imaginary
6. Fade Away
7. Gibberish
8. Thunder
9. Interlude
10. A Love Like This
11. L-Over
12. Prototype
13. Hear Me (Remix)
14. Fallen (Acoustic Mix)

Revolt was written, arranged and produced by Eli T., except for collaborations with Natasha and Malcolm for the lyrics of 'Fade Away', DJ Hoo.Da.Man on 'Hear Me (Remix)', and Justin Low for the co-arrangement (Guitar) for 'Fallen (Acoustic Mix)'

EPs

- Key to My Life: Released 2006
