= Ted Juggins =

English footballer

Personal information
- Full name: Eleader Juggins
- Date of birth: 15 June 1882
- Place of birth: Bilston, England
- Date of death: 17 August 1966 (aged 84)
- Place of death: Nuneaton, England
- Positions: Right back; centre half

Senior career*
Years	Team	Apps	(Gls)
1897–1900	Willenhall Swifts		
1900–1904	Darlaston		
1904–1906	Wolverhampton Wanderers	22	(0)
1907–1913	Coventry City	68	(2)
- Southampton
- * Club domestic league appearances and goals

Eleader Juggins (15 June 1882 – 17 August 1966), sometimes known as Ted Juggins or Eli Juggins, was an English professional footballer who played as a goalkeeper in the Football League for Wolverhampton Wanderers.

== Personal life ==
Juggins served as a gunner in the Royal Garrison Artillery during the First World War. After his retirement from football, he returned to Coventry City as a ground superintendent.

== Career statistics ==
Appearances and goals by club, season and competition
Club	Season	League			FA Cup		Total	
Club	Season	Division	Apps	Goals	Apps	Goals	Apps	Goals
Coventry City	1907–08	Southern League First Division	0	0	8	4	8	4
Coventry City	1908–09	Southern League First Division	28	2	1	0	29	2
Coventry City	1909–10	Southern League First Division	20	0	1	0	21	0
Coventry City	1910–11	Southern League First Division	16	0	1	0	17	0
Coventry City	1911–12	Southern League First Division	2	0	0	0	2	0
Coventry City	1913–14	Southern League First Division	2	0	1	0	3	0
Career total			68	2	12	4	80	6
