= Eli Cohen (disambiguation) =

Eli Cohen (1924–1965) was an Israeli spy in Syria.

Eli Cohen is also the name of:

- Eli Cohen (actor) (born 1940), Israeli film actor and director
- Élie Cohen (conductor) (fl. 1920–1940), French conductor
- Eli Cohen (footballer, born 1951), Israeli football manager
- Eli Cohen (footballer, born 1961), Israeli football manager
- Eli Cohen (politician, born 1949), Israeli politician
- Eli Cohen (politician, born 1972), Israeli politician, currently Minister of Energy, formerly minister of several other departments
- Elie Aron Cohen (1909–1993), Dutch Jewish doctor and Holocaust survivor who wrote books and publications about extermination camps and their survivors
