= Eli King =

Eli King is the name of:

- Eli King (footballer) (born 2002), Welsh footballer
- Eli C. King (fl. 1820s), American politician
