= Eli Piilonen =

American video game developer

- Occupation: Game designer

Eli Piilonen, also known under the pseudonym 2DArray, is a Nebraska-based American video game developer working as lead designer at indie studio Messhof. Piilonen is however, mainly known for his earlier, independent work on browser games such as, Spewer (with Edmund McMillen), the art game The Company of Myself, its prequel Fixation and the roguelike Not The Robots. The Company of Myself and to a lesser extent its prequel Fixation have frequently been cited as an early art game that successfully explores issues of mental health.
