= Eli Waldron =

American journalist

- Eli Waldron, circa 1940s
- Born: January 25, 1916; Oconto Falls, Wisconsin, United States
- Died: June 9, 1980 (aged 64)
- Occupations: Writer, artist
- Writing career
- Genres: Fiction, poetry, non-fiction, journalism, drawing, humor, satire
- Notable works: The Lonely Lady of Union Square (1955), A Carnival of Frogs (1953)
- Notable awards: Participation Award, Simon & Schuster

Eli Waldron (January 25, 1916 to June 9, 1980) was an American writer and journalist whose primary work consisted of short stories, essays, and poetry. His writings were published in literary journals (such as The Kenyon Review, Prairie Schooner, and Story) and popular periodicals (such as Collier's, Holiday, Rolling Stone, Saturday Evening Post). From the 1950s to 1970s he contributed stories and essays to The New Yorker, and in the 1960s and 1970s, a number of his poems and experimental fiction works appeared in underground, alternative, and "counter-culture" publications, such as The Illustrated Paper, Rat Subterranean News, Underground, The Village Voice, and The Woodstock Times.

Much of Waldron's fiction and non-fiction reveals a strong interest in the "underdog" and the marginalized, disenfranchised individual, as well as a belief in the possibility of triumph over (often seemingly great) adversity. Making repeated use of satire and often introducing surprise endings, Waldron consistently questioned what he perceived to be the status quo and championed those who may have been viewed as "outsiders" by people in authority or by members of society's "mainstream." This outlook and approach may be seen vividly in such fiction pieces as "The Beekeeper" (published in Prairie Schooner in 1943) and "Zawicki the Chicken" (Cross Section 1945: A Collection of New American Writing), as well as in such non-fiction portraits as "The Death of Hank Williams" (The Reporter, 1955) and "The Lonely Lady of Union Square" (The New Yorker, 1955).

Despite his literary achievement, he did not see a book published in his lifetime, nor has one appeared since. Nonetheless, his work continues to gain attention and recognition. In 2013, The Kenyon Review published his story, "Do Birds Like Television?" along with six of his drawings featuring birds. The first part of his two-part article, "The Death of Hank Williams" (1955) was included in excerpted form in The Hank Williams Reader issued by Oxford University Press in 2014.

== Biography ==
Waldron was born Gerald Cleveland Waldron in 1916 in Oconto Falls, Wisconsin where he grew up. He was the youngest of his parents Rose Cleveland and Jonathan Witcher Waldron's seven children. His mother wrote poetry, and his brother Jonathan Gilbert Waldron (1910–1974) was an advertising manager and writer, whose short stories and articles were published in popular periodicals during the 1950s.

Waldron's first literary efforts in the early 1940s resulted in some critical praise. Author Katherine Anne Porter, for example, remarked, in 1943, that Waldron possessed "the spark" and that his work was able to reveal the "deeper stratum of human suffering." He attracted the attention of future literary agent, Donald Congdon in New York, who began representing him in 1943 on behalf of Lurton Blassingame's literary agency, and soon he was considered one of the most promising young writers in the United States. In 1945, he received a literary prize, the "Participation Award," from the publishing firm, Simon & Schuster for the completion of a novel. His resulting novella, "The Low Dark Road" received strong responses of praise as well as criticism from the firm's editors, and ultimately was not published. He did not rise to the same heights of fame as such contemporaries as James Baldwin, J. D. Salinger, and Herman Wouk. Waldron moved to Charlton Street in New York City in 1947 and became part of a literary circle that included Hollis Alpert, Josephine Herbst, S. J. Perelman, and J. D. Salinger. Following the publication in July 1951, of his review of J. D. Salinger's novel The Catcher in the Rye, Salinger wrote his reviewer a warm note of thanks, adding: "I hope one day somebody writes with that much perception and feeling about a book of yours." Waldron continued publishing short stories in Collier's through the early 1950s. He went on to develop his career as a magazine journalist, publishing articles and stories in Holiday, Rolling Stone, Saturday Evening Post, and The New Yorker. His last piece for a major periodical, a profile of the artist Saul Steinberg, appeared in Publishers Weekly on May 7, 1973.

Despite what writers such as Howard Mitcham, and Richard Gehman, describe as bouts of writer's block, depression, and alcoholism, he wrote and published until his death in 1980, producing masterful works of literary fiction, striking journalism, irreverent travelogues, satirical flights of fancy, lively verse and even lyrics, as well as drawings. In his 1967 Chicago Tribune article, entitled, "Eli Waldron, Where Are You Now?," Gehman remarked that the suddenly difficult to locate Waldron, who had been part of Gehman's own Greenwich Village literary circle in the 1940s and 1950s, was "one of the best, and perhaps least appreciated, writers of my time." Longtime New Yorker editor, William Shawn, echoed these words in a eulogy for Waldron on November 15, 1980, stating, "What [Waldron] wrote gleamed, and gleams brighter with the passage of time." Shawn also stated, quite simply, that Waldron was "an original, an innovator," and "a writer of immense talent who wrote far too little, perhaps because the standards he set for himself were so high that even he could rarely reach them."

== Marriage and family ==
Waldron was married four times. His third marriage to painter Phyllis Floyd in 1960 produced two daughters, Zoe and Eve.

== Death ==
Waldron died in a car crash on Monday, June 9, 1980, on Route 15 in Gordonsville, Virginia, while visiting novelist Christian Gehman, the son of Richard Gehman. He was 64 and had been living in Woodstock, N.Y. since 1974 with his wife Marie Waldron.

== Drawings ==
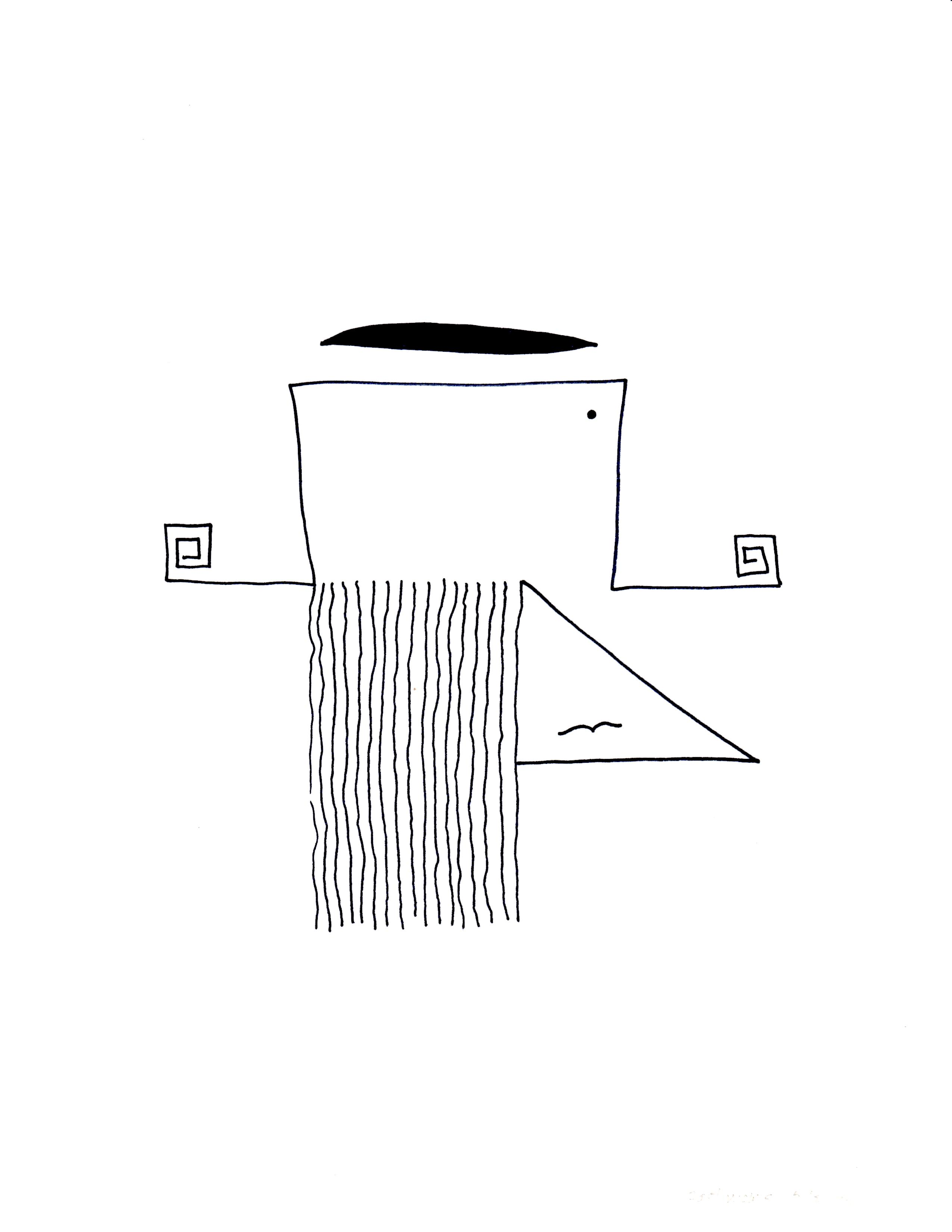
Fast Nichts February 5, 1975.

Eli Waldron's drawings, dating from the 1950s to 1980, were less known than his literary work, with only one published during his lifetime. Nonetheless, they represent an important part of his oeuvre. In these drawings, words and images coalesce to create a literary form of art. Many are captioned and deal with the themes of love, sex, nature, the individual, politics, power, religion, spirituality, and the cosmos with concision, wit, and humor. Motifs include trees, birds, eyes, faces, and signs. A recurrent feature in the drawings is the profile of a long-nosed man, who could be said to represent the artist, observing.

The body of the works include single drawings, groups of related drawings, collections, such as "Varieties of Religious Experience," (undated), and illustrated books, such as "Presto," 1973, that combine drawings with prose or poetry. Some works, such as the collection "Ipglok," ca. 1973, are "word art", in which words themselves, in unusual spellings and arrangements, are the subject of the work. Most are in a linear style, favored by Saul Steinberg and Picasso. His works are executed in Rapidograph or Flair felt tip pens on the same 12 x 18 in. or 8 1/2 x 11 in. paper he also used for his writing, on smaller sheets of paper, and in drawing pads; and he made drawings in some of his correspondence and poetry. He also made paintings on 12 x 16 in. canvas panels.

== List of works ==
=== Published and unanthologized short stories ===
- "Ah Me, Ah the Bum, Ah Flo, Ah Mr. Saroyan" (Decade of Short Stories, March–April 1940); Crooks, Glenn C.
- "It Was Wonderful" (Decade of Short Stories, March–April 1940); Waldron, G. C.
- "How I Met a Writer" (Decade of Short Stories, July–August 1940); Crooks, Glenn C.
- "Handful of Deuteronomy" (Matrix, Nov.-Dec. [1940 or 1941?]); Waldron, Gerald
- "Don't You See, Can't You Tell?" (Prairie Schooner, Winter 1941)
- "This Lucky Man Our Friend" (Story, March 1942)
- "The Beekeeper" (Story, Winter 1943)
- "Come Hercule" (The Kenyon Review, Winter 1943)
- "Nooley and the Flute" (The Saturday Evening Post, July 1944)
- "The Beautiful Burial of Uncle Joe" (Collier's, July 1944)
- "Music of Little Bells" (Collier's, [1945?])
- "Bodney, Bodney" (American Magazine, February 1945)
- "The Nephew" (Collier's, March 1945)
- "Hello Gibbs" (Good Housekeeping, March 1945)
- "The Monument" (Collier's, April 1945)
- "Elmira Forever" (Collier's, October 1945)
- "The Happy Haunt" (American Magazine, February 1946)
- "Mr. Morrisey the Amiable Printer" (The Kenyon Review, Spring 1946)
- "The Spankferkel" (Story, November 1946)
- "The False Heart" (Collier's, October 1947)
- "The Day Before Sunday" (Collier's, March 1948)
- "The Really True Secret of Life" (Collier's, [1948?])
- "Are You Tired, Mr. Millikan?" (Collier's, June 1951)
- "The Copper Mountain" (Collier's, [1953?])
- "Do Birds Like Television?" (ca. 1973,The Kenyon Review, Winter 2013)

=== Anthologized short stories ===
- "Zawicki, The Chicken" (Cross Section 1945: A Collection of New American Writing, ed. Edwin Seaver New York: L.B. Fisher, 1945.)

== Sources ==
- Eli Waldron obituary, New York Times, Thursday, June 12, 1980.
- Gehman, Richard. "Eli Waldron, Where are You Now?," Chicago Tribune, "Books Today," Sunday, July 2, 1967, p. 3.
- Hutchens, John K. "People Who Read and Write," New York Times, "Book Review," March 17, 1946, p. BR13.
- Shawn, William. Eulogy for Eli Waldron. Read at St. Marks Church-In-The-Bowery, November 15, 1980
- Waldron, Eli. Papers. Private collection. New York.
