= Ekko Astral =

American punk rock band

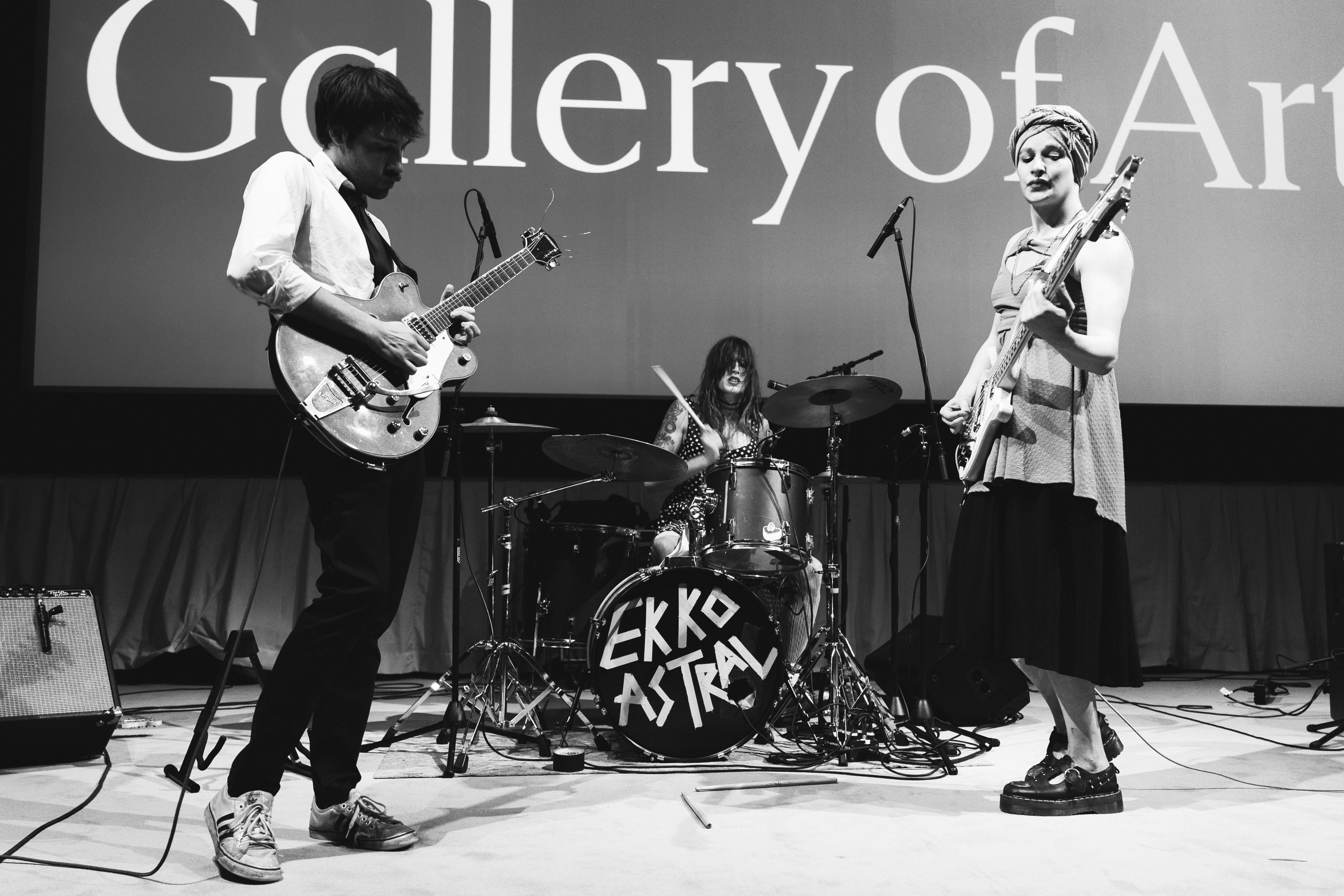
- Ekko Astral in 2024. From left to right: Hughes, Tyler, Holzman.

Background information
- Origin: Washington, D.C.
- Genres: Noise punk; pop-punk; post-hardcore; queercore; riot grrrl
- Years active: 2021–2026
- Label: Topshelf Records
- Members: Jael Holzman; Liam Hughes
- Past members: Stephen Yaeger; Guinevere Tully; Sam Elmore; Miri Tyler

Ekko Astral was an American punk rock band based in Washington, D.C. The group plays a blend of noise rock and pop-punk, referred to by the band as "mascara mosh pit". Their only album, Pink Balloons, was released on Topshelf Records in 2024.

== History ==
=== 2021–2023: Formation and Quartz ===
Ekko Astral started in 2021, after longtime friends Jael Holzman and Liam Hughes reconnected following Hughes moving to Washington, D.C. in 2021. The pair previously wrote music together while they attended the University of Vermont but disbanded post graduation. Their debut EP, Quartz, was recorded for Hughes' master's thesis at American University, where he was studying audio technology. Before the recording of Quartz, Holzman came out as a trans woman. In recording the EP, Holzman wanted to provide an outlet for expressing the emotions she felt coming to terms with her transgender identity during the COVID-19 pandemic.

Bassist and percussionist Miri Tyler was recruited from Washington, D.C.'s DIY music scene for the recording of Quartz. Following the recording and release of Quartz, Tyler was made the group's full-time drummer, and was joined by fellow trans D.C. indie musician Guinevere Tully on bass. The band's lineup was finalized with the addition of rhythm guitarist Sam Elmore, a childhood friend of Holzman's. The group's first release as a quintet was the live EP The Quartz Farewell, recorded at Comet Ping Pong in 2023.

=== 2024: Pink Balloons and breakthrough ===
Ekko Astral announced their signing to Topshelf Records in 2024; their full-length debut Pink Balloons was released through the label on April 17. Its release was preceded by that of singles "Baethoven", "Devorah", and "On Brand", which received enthusiastic profiles in outlets including NPR and Stereogum. Stereogum also included Ekko Astral in their annual list of "The 40 Best New Artists" for 2024. Pitchfork ranked the album No. 1 on its list of "The 30 Best Rock Albums of 2024." The "i90" collaboration with Josaleigh Pollett was also featured in Best of the Year lists by Paste and Uproxx.

In 2024, it was announced the group would be supporting Idles on tour for three dates in the Southern United States, as well as opening for Ted Leo and the Pharmacists on the first leg of their Shake the Sheets 20th anniversary tour. As of May 2024, the band are working on their next release, "a concept album about the Beltway".

In July 2024, Tully left the group to focus on her solo project, Rosslyn Station. Holzman became the group's bass player in her absence. Elmore announced his departure two months later on September 4.

=== 2025: Reissues, touring, and Liberation Weekend ===
In April 2025, the band released Pink Balloons: Popped, a reissued version of their debut album to commemorate its first anniversary.

In 2025, Ekko Astral partnered with the non-profit collective Gender Liberation Movement to organize a two-day music and arts festival (May 30–31, 2025) called Liberation Weekend in Washington, D.C. The festival was in support of the transgender community; proceeds generated were planned to fund rallies, demonstrations, and direct actions in protest of anti-trans businesses and policymaking. The festival featured performances from Ekko Astral, L'Rain, Home Is Where, Ted Leo, Speedy Ortiz, and others.

In September through October 2025 Ekko Astral performed with PUP and Jeff Rosenstock, opening for them as part of their "PUP + Jeff Rosentock Present: A Cataclysmic Rapture of Friendshipness" tour in the U.S.

=== 2026: The Beltway is Burning, lineup turmoil, and hiatus ===
On January 28, 2026, Ekko Astral announced they had organized a second Liberation Weekend, lasting from April 24 to 26, which would see the band play at DC's Black Cat nightclub. They also announced that this show would be the final time Miri Tyler would play with the band, as she would be focusing on her solo work and her band Pretty Bitter. A couple weeks later, on February 11, the band announced their sophomore album, The Beltway is Burning, originally set to be released on April 22. Along with the announcement came the release of the single "Lil Xan Goes to Washington".

However, shortly after these announcements, it was reported by the Washington City Paper that Holzman had gotten a peace order requiring that Tyler not contact her for six months, effectively ending her time in the band. In this same report, former band member Guinevere Tully accused Holzman of releasing remixes without her permission and bragging about threatening violence. Following this, Topshelf Records announced they would be dropping Ekko Astral from their label, the release of The Beltway is Burning would be canceled and that they would be no longer doing PR for the band or album. When asked by Pitchfork if the decision to drop the band was due to the issues between Holzman and Tyler, Topshelf's representative said “Yes, all of these events, and more, have irreversibly impacted our ability to continue working with this band or releasing their music. We have no further comment.”

Originally, the band intended to self release their second album on their own and continue on with their performances. But on March 4, they announced that they would be pulling out of Liberation Weekend II and postponing the release of The Beltway is Burning, saying that once they were done doing a few dates opening for Mclusky on the Pacific Coast at the end of the month, they would be stepping back to "recalibrate". Their time opening for McLusky went smooth with no issues and positive reviews.

On July 15, 2026, after months of inactivity, the band announced they were entering an indefinite hiatus, stating they were ending the project "for the foreseeable future" in order to prioritize other musical endeavors. They also confirmed that The Beltway is Burning would not be released "any time soon". The band announced two farewell performances, scheduled for August 22 in New York City and August 27 in Washington, D.C., which they said would serve as a celebration of their catalog. At the Washington, D.C. show, the band also planned to raffle the original painting used for the cover of Pink Balloons, with proceeds benefiting trans health services at Whitman-Walker.

== Style and influences ==
Ekko Astral's name was derived from a lyric in the Death Grips song "Come Up And Get Me", the opening track from their album No Love Deep Web.

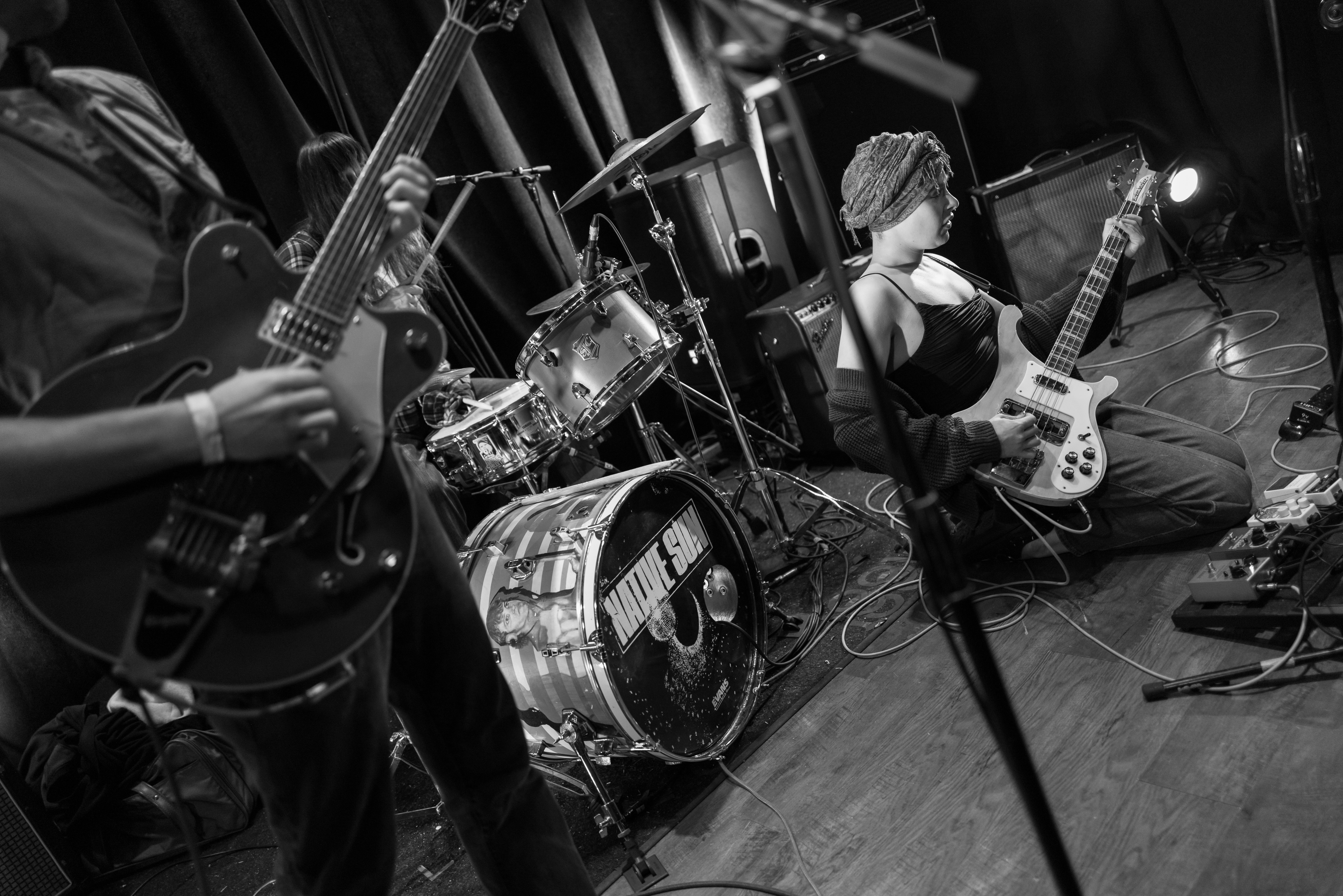
Ekko Astral performing at Pie Shop in Washington, D.C. in 2024

The group uses the genre label of "mascara moshpit" music as a descriptor of both their musical style as well as the queer and countercultural leanings of their music. While the group intended Quartz to be explicitly about the experience of being transgender, Pink Balloons features a more expanded focus. Tully describes their music as "for [trans women], but not just for [trans women]"; while Holzman says their primary audience for their music is those "who are struggling, who are at their absolute lowest".

Describing the band's sound in opposition to those of other punk influences, Holzman has said that Ekko Astral is "just Charli XCX and Sophie with loud guitars". The lyrics of Pink Balloons have been compared to those of Arctic Monkeys; Holzman has named their album Tranquility Base Hotel & Casino as an influence. Ekko Astral has also drawn influence from Jeff Rosenstock, Kendrick Lamar, Ethel Cain, Gilla Band, Idles, and Ditz, alongside other trans-fronted punk acts such as Lambrini Girls, Crush Fund, and Anita Velveeta.

== Members ==
=== Current members ===
- Jael Holzman – lead vocals (2021–2026) bass guitar (2024–2026)
- Liam Hughes – lead guitar, keyboards (2021–2026)

=== Former members ===
- Miri Tyler – drums, percussion, keyboards (2022–2026) bass guitar (2021–2022)
- Stephen Yaeger – drums, percussion (2021–2022)
- Guinevere Tully – bass guitar (2022–2024)
- Sam Elmore – rhythm guitar (2022–2024)

== Discography ==
=== Studio albums ===
- Pink Balloons (2024)

=== EPs ===
Studio

- Quartz (2022)

Live

- The Quartz Farewell (2023)
- fuck this band: live at the chapel (2026)
