= Liberation Weekend =

2025 music and arts festival in Washington, D.C.

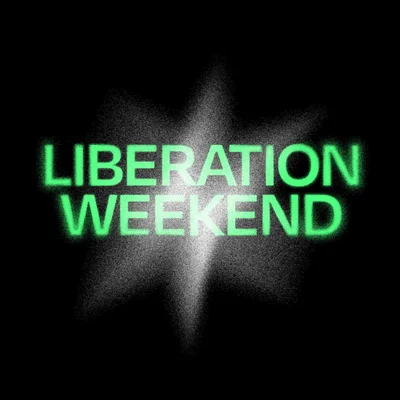
- Genre: Music and arts festival, Trans, LGBTQ
- Date: May 30, 2025–May 31, 2025
- Venue: Black Cat, DC9 Nightclub
- Location: Washington, D.C.
- Country: United States
- Founders: Gender Liberation Movement, Ekko Astral
- Next event: Liberation Weekend II
- People: Jael Holzman
- Website: linktree.com/liberationwknd

Liberation Weekend was a two-day music and arts festival that took place in Washington, D.C. on May 30–31, 2025. The festival was organized by Ekko Astral and Gender Liberation Movement. The event sought to support the transgender community, with proceeds funding Gender Liberation Movement's actions against trans discrimination by businesses and policymakers. Featured performers included Ekko Astral, Home Is Where, Ted Leo, Speedy Ortiz, and others.

A follow-up festival, dubbed Liberation Weekend II, took place the following year on April 24–26, 2026. The festival was designed to benefit transgender rights advocacy by raising funds for trans aid organizations Gender Liberation Movement and No More Dysphoria. Featured performers include Laura Jane Grace, Pissed Jeans, Ezra Furman, and Pom Pom Squad.

== Background ==
The founding of Liberation Weekend came from a collaboration between the punk band Ekko Astral and the non-profit, collective organization Gender Liberation Movement. In December 2024, Jael Holzman (a co-founding member of Ekko Astral) published an article in Rolling Stone skeptical of the Democratic Party's willingness to protect trans rights and access to trans health care in the face of future attacks by the Trump administration. Following publication, Holzman was asked if she wanted to report on a protest at the U.S. Capitol that was organized by Gender Liberation Movement, in response to the Capitol bathroom ban that barred trans people from using bathrooms other than those of their sex assigned birth. Inspired by Gender Liberation Movement's efforts, Holzman instead wanted to aid in their activism. With the support of Ekko Astral and their community, she and Gender Liberation Movement spent the next four months planning a music festival that would raise funds to support trans rights. The organizers faced obstacles in raising money to host the festival; some companies refused to sponsor the event because they did not want to be publicly associated with it, despite having been supporters of Ekko Astral in the past.

This work resulted in the inaugural Liberation Weekend festival, which was announced publicly on April 2, 2025. The event was billed as "two days of music & arts for trans liberty" with "our nation's most forward-thinking rock and pop acts". In addition to live bands, the event advertised a dance afterparty, DJ sets, stand-up comedy, and performance pieces. The festival would take place May 30–31, 2025 in Washington, D.C. (at venues Black Cat and DC9) as part of WorldPride 2025, with all net proceeds benefiting trans activism activities by Gender Liberation Movement. Public sponsors included Topshelf Records, Father/Daughter Records, the nonprofit organization No More Dysphoria, the music distribution and patronage site Mirlo, and Right Proper Brewing Company. Supporters such as Audrey Zee Whitesides (of the band Speedy Ortiz) and Dust Reid (of Red Hot Organization) expressed their enthusiasm for the event and its dedication to supporting trans rights. In addition to providing financial support to trans activism, Holzman claimed that the festival was meant to inspire artists to "stand in vocal support of the trans community."

Liberation Weekend was included in Vulture's 2025 list of "can't-miss" upcoming music festivals. The event was received favorably, with one writer stating it "feels like a landmark moment in D.C.'s punk history." The festival was praised for its community-driven model of supporting those advocating for trans rights, a diversity of energetic performances, and celebratory attitude in the face of anti-trans attacks. Liberation Weekend successfully raised over $30,000 for Gender Liberation Movement.

== Lineup ==
=== 2025 ===
According to Holzman, Liberation Weekend artists were selected to represent what a "truly inclusive trans-forward and trans-fronted music festival could really look like" across a range of musical genres. Performances spanned genres such as pop, rock, post-punk, noise rock, folk rock, punk, and shoegaze. Bands primarily came from the DIY and indie music subcultures, emphasizing bands with trans members and those who advocate vocally in support of trans issues. The lineup was majority-LGBTQ.

For the first day of the festival (occurring Friday, May 30, 2025 from 6PM–3AM), the initial announcement listed musical performances by Home Is Where, Pinkshift, Combat, Pretty Bitter, Perennial, Zora, Um, Jennifer?, and two "special secret artists" that were later revealed to be Greg Freeman and Pop Music Fever Dream. It also listed DJ sets by LeCamille, Vanfleet, pet wife, and Midnight Ecstasy.

For the second day of the festival (occurring Saturday, May 31, 2025 from 2PM–3AM), the initial announcement listed musical performances by Ted Leo, Speedy Ortiz, Downtown Boys, Ekko Astral, Pure Adult, Vaelastrasz, Big Girl, and FAITH/VOID. The second day also included two showcases: the Red Hot Org/TRAИƧA Showcase featuring TRAИƧA artists L'Rain, Bartees Strange, and Asher White and the Locals Only Showcase featuring Washington, D.C. DIY and queer artists Pinky Lemon, Cherub Tree, Massie, and Berra. It also listed DJ sets by Eev Frances, Time Wharp, Clear Channel, and DJ horse jeans.

On May 7 2025, Liberation Weekend organizers announced an updated lineup in which The Ophelias would headline on Day 1, replacing Combat who were no longer performing for unstated reasons. Additional lineup changes were announced in May. An updated schedule included a performance by Miri Tyler as part of the Locals Only Showcase, replacing Cherub Tree who could no longer perform due to a band member injury. Additionally, emcees were included in the schedule: Day 1 was hosted by stand-up comedian Charlie Girard and the nonprofit organization Trans Music Archive. Day 2 was hosted by cartoonist Mattie Lubchansky, comedian Josh Gondelman, and writer Rax King. Rax King also participated in an unofficial Liberation Weekend 'Eve' event on May 29 at Black Cat in conversation with fellow writer Niko Stratis. The event featured a reading and Q&A session with Stratis regarding her recently published book, The Dad Rock That Made Me A Woman.

May 30, 2025 (Day 1)
Black Cat	DC9
Pop Music Fever Dream; Greg Freeman^{[a]}; Pretty Bitter; The Ophelias; Pinkshift; Home Is Where	pet wife^{[b]}; Perennial; ZORA; Midnight Ecstasy^{[b]}; Um, Jennifer?; LeCamille^{[b]}; Vanfleet^{[b]}

May 31, 2025 (Day 2)
Black Cat	DC9
FAITH/VOID; Big Girl; Ted Leo^{[a]}; Downtown Boys; Speedy Ortiz; Bartees Strange^{[a]}^{[c]}; Asher White^{[c]}; L'Rain^{[a]}^{[c]}	Miri Tyler^{[d]}; Berra^{[d]}; Massie^{[d]}; Pinky Lemon^{[d]}; Clear Channel^{[b]}; Vaelastrasz; Pure Adult; Time Wharp^{[b]}; Ekko Astral^{[e]}; DJ horse jeans^{[b]}; Eev Frances^{[b]}

a. Solo performance
b. DJ performance
c. Featured in Red Hot Org/TRAИƧA showcase
d. Featured in Locals Only showcase
e. Included performances with members of bands/artists Latchkey Kids, Home Is Where, Big Girl, Bad Moves, Berra, and Ted Leo.

=== 2026 ===
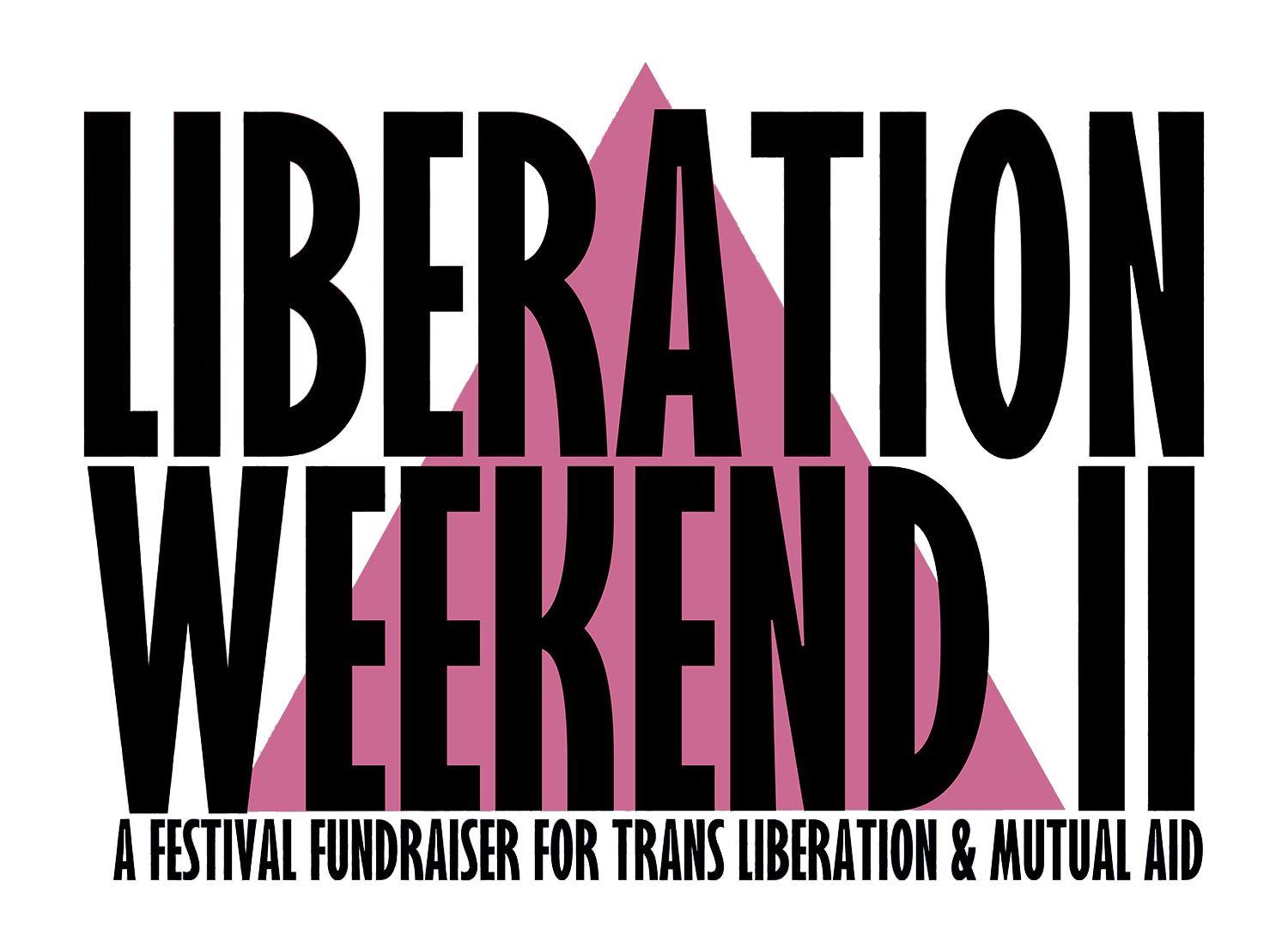
Liberation Weekend II logo

For the first day of the second year's festival (Friday, April 24, 2026) the initial announcement listed Black Cat main stage musical performances by headliner Laura Jane Grace, Snowing, Gladie, Spring Silver, thisdogllhunt, and Eevie Echoes & The Locations.

For the second day of the festival (Saturday, April 25, 2026) the initial announcement listed Transmission day party performances by Crush Fund, Cryptid Summer, Ultra Deluxe, Soul Meets Body, ok, cuddle, and Somebody's Daughter. Main stage performances included headliner Ekko Astral & Friends, Pissed Jeans, Bambara, Ragana, MX LONELY, and Adult Human Females.

For the third day of the festival (Sunday, April 26, 2026) the initial announcement listed Transmission day party performances by Peach Rings, Hit Like A Girl, Jade Weapon, Motocrossed, Latchkey Kids, and Tripper. Main stage performances included headliner Illuminati Hotties (playing Free I.H.), Ezra Furman, Pool Kids, Pom Pom Squad, Pretty Bitter, and Pinky Lemon. Artists performing at the Transmission after-party for each day were to be announced at a later date.

On March 30, 2026, Liberation Weekend II organizers announced that D.C. activist Rayceen Pendarvisan would emcee main stage events along with an updated lineup. Devi McCallion would replace Ekko Astral as headliner on Day 2 and Pool Kids would replace Illuminati Hotties as headliner on Day 3. Instead, Illuminati Hotties donated a signed, limited-edition vinyl of their album FREE I.H.: Five Years Free (2025) to the festival's silent auction. Other changes include the cancellation of Tripper (due to the band's dissolution) and the addition of D.C. bands RenRiot and Emotional World to the daytime showcases. The Philadelphia band Hit Like A Girl moved from the Day 3 daytime showcase to the Day 3 main stage bill. The organizers also announced after-party artists for Days 1 and 2 at Transmission.

April 24, 2026 (Day 1)
Black Cat Main Stage	Transmission	
Black Cat Main Stage	Daytime Showcase	After-Party
Eevie Echoes & The Locations; thisdogllhunt; Spring Silver; Gladie; Snowing; Laura Jane Grace	No events	Claire.h0e; Cortisa Star; Franxx; Get Face; Dylan Ali; Jada Doll; Enfleshed; Etherpleaser; Sinny Nova; Thablackgod; Zepkins; Znorthy

April 25, 2026 (Day 2)
Black Cat Main Stage	Transmission	
Black Cat Main Stage	Daytime Showcase	After-Party
Adult Human Females; MX LONELY; Ragana; Bambara; Pissed Jeans; Devi McCallion	Somebody's Daughter; ok, cuddle; RenRiot; Ultra Deluxe; Cryptid Summer; Crush Fund	Archangel; Armana Khan; CENSORED Dialogue; Hissyfit; Mrs. Qbert; Trinity For3ver

April 26, 2026 (Day 3)
Black Cat Main Stage	Transmission	
Black Cat Main Stage	Daytime Showcase	After-Party
Pinky Lemon; Hit Like A Girl; Pretty Bitter; Pom Pom Squad; Ezra Furman; Pool Kids	Emotional World; Soul Meets Body; Motocrossed; Latchkey Kids; Jade Weapon; Peach Rings	No events

== Gallery ==
=== Performances at Liberation Weekend ===
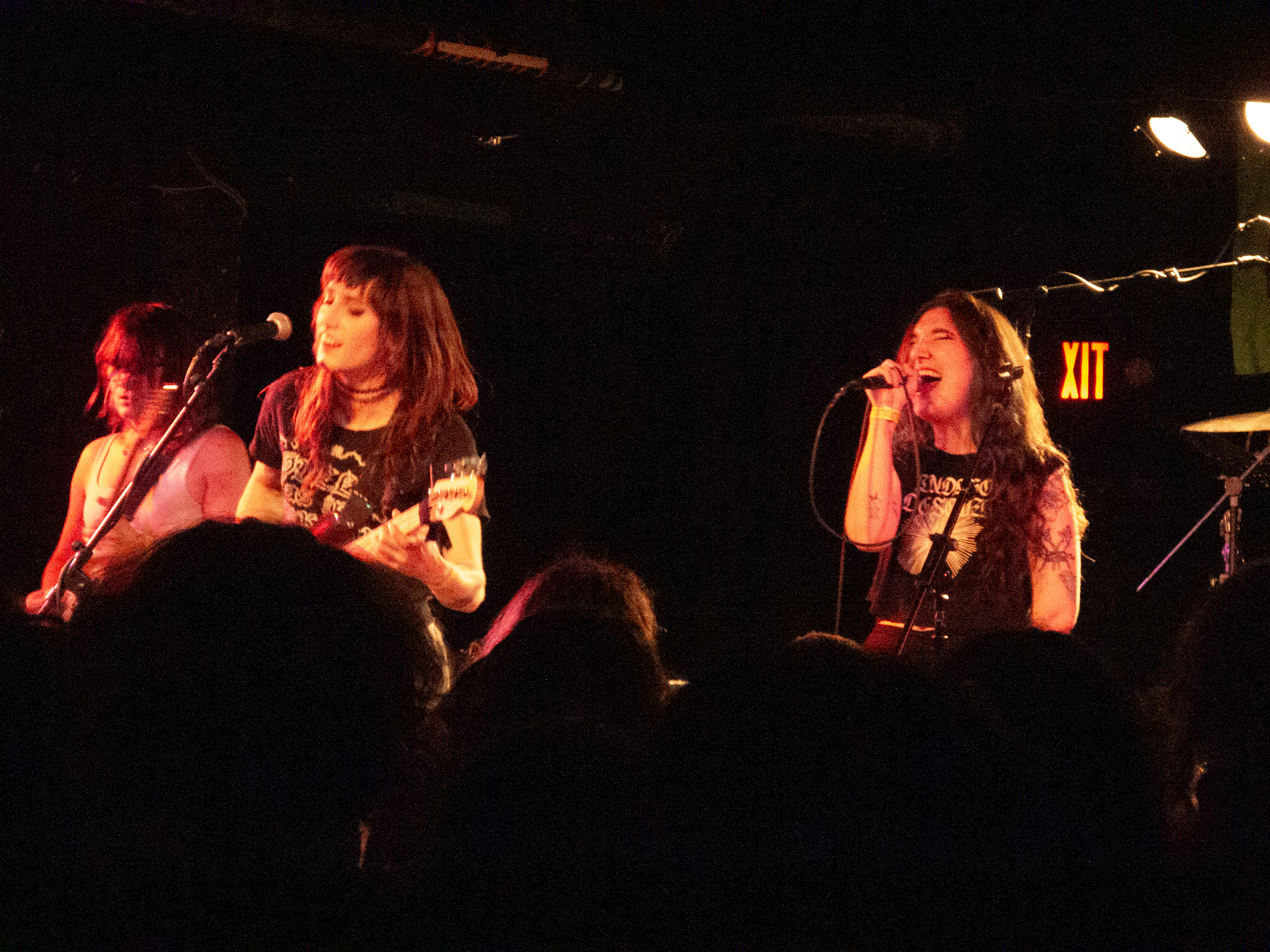
Pretty Bitter performance at Liberation Weekend 2025

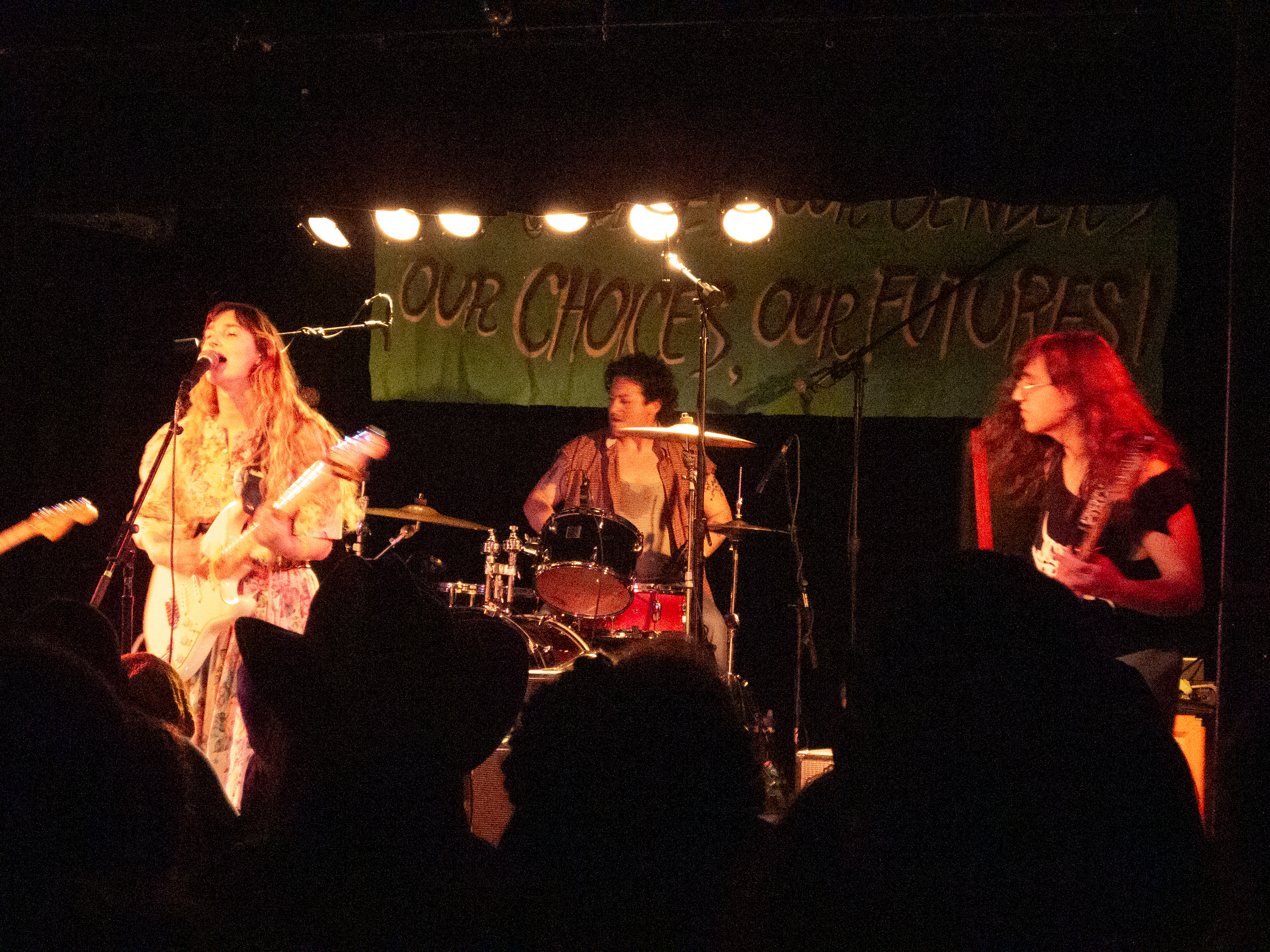
The Ophelias performance at Liberation Weekend 2025

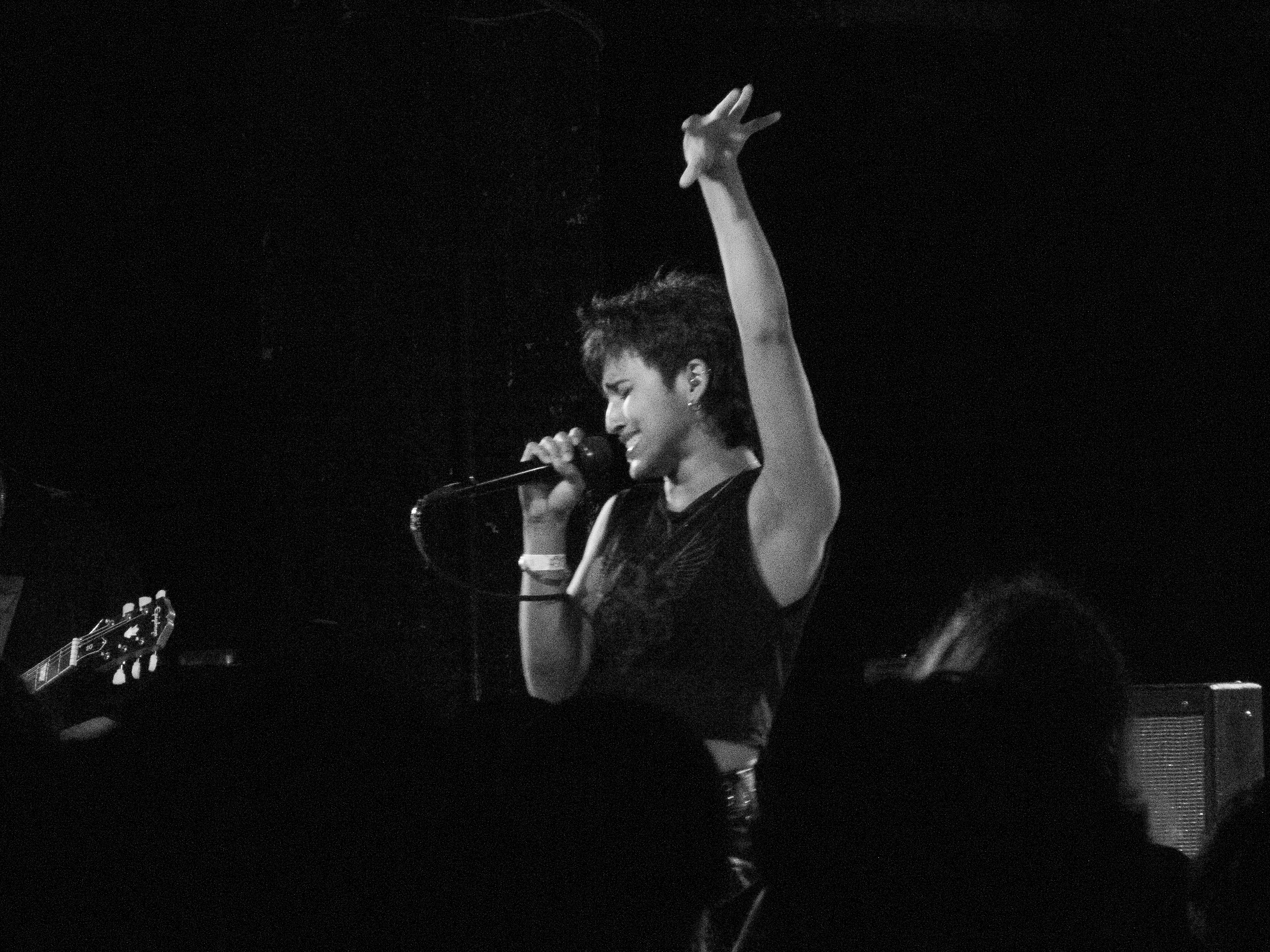
Pinkshift performance at Liberation Weekend 2025

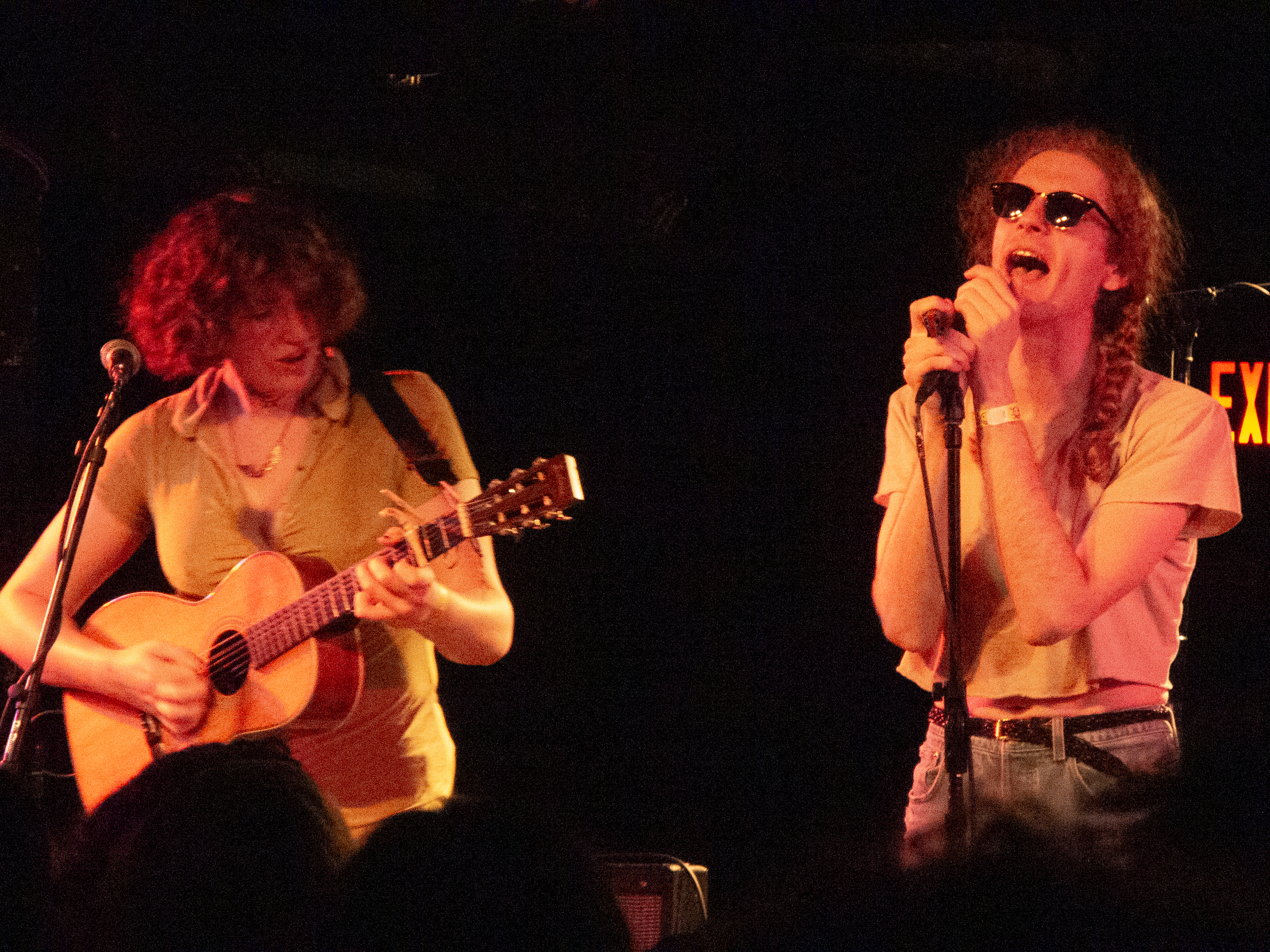
Home Is Where performance at Liberation Weekend 2025

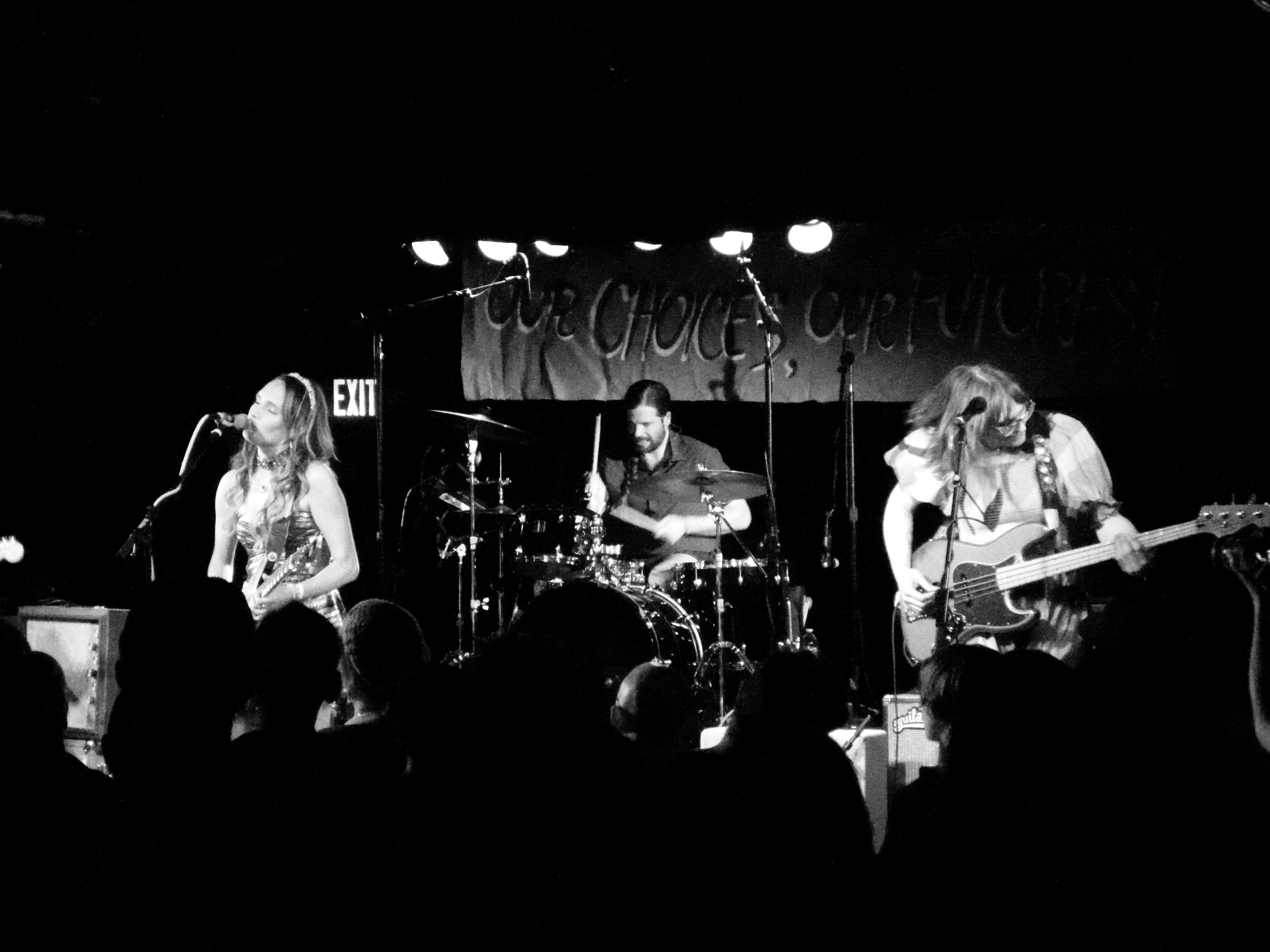
Speedy Ortiz performance at Liberation Weekend 2025

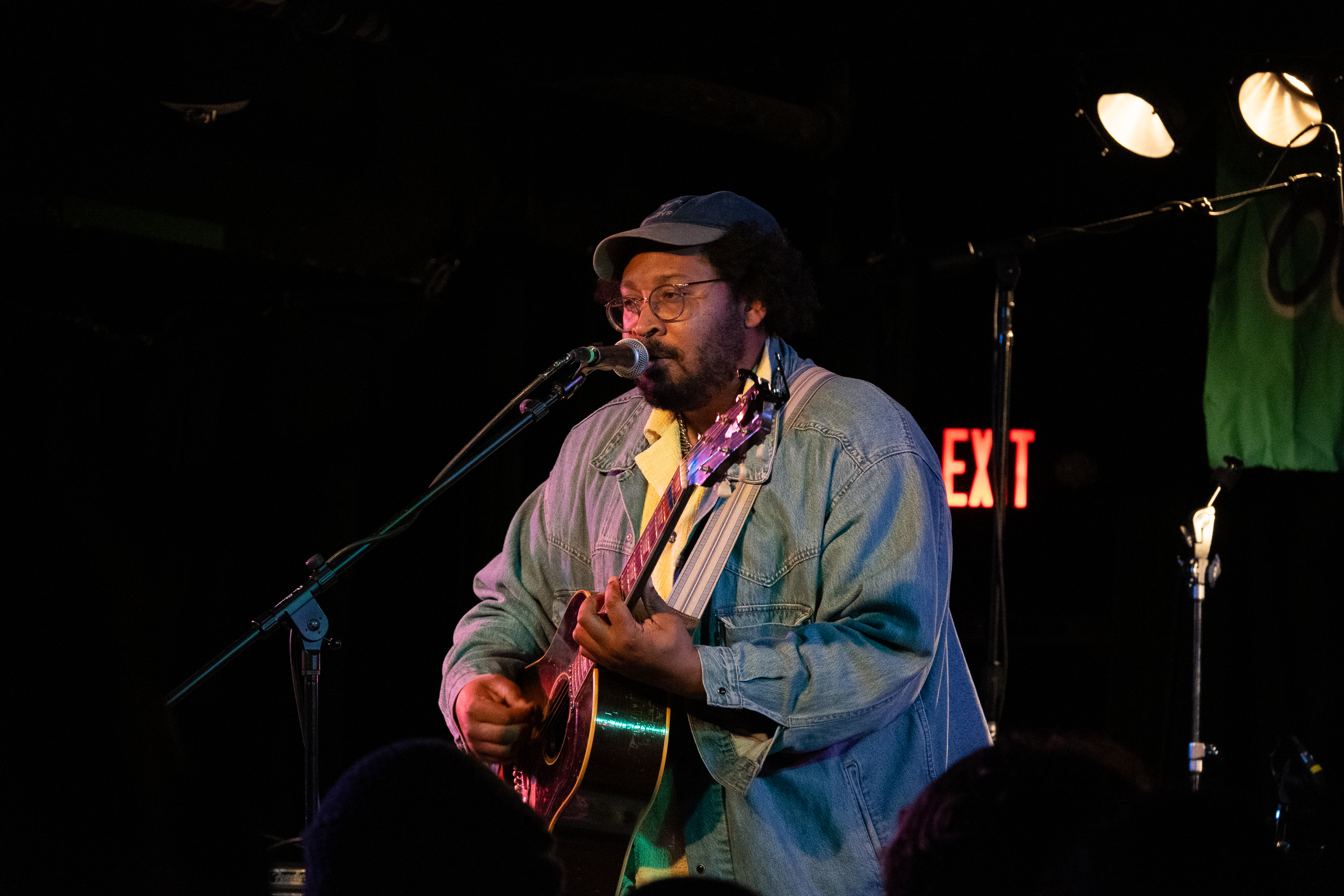
Bartees Strange performance at Liberation Weekend 2025

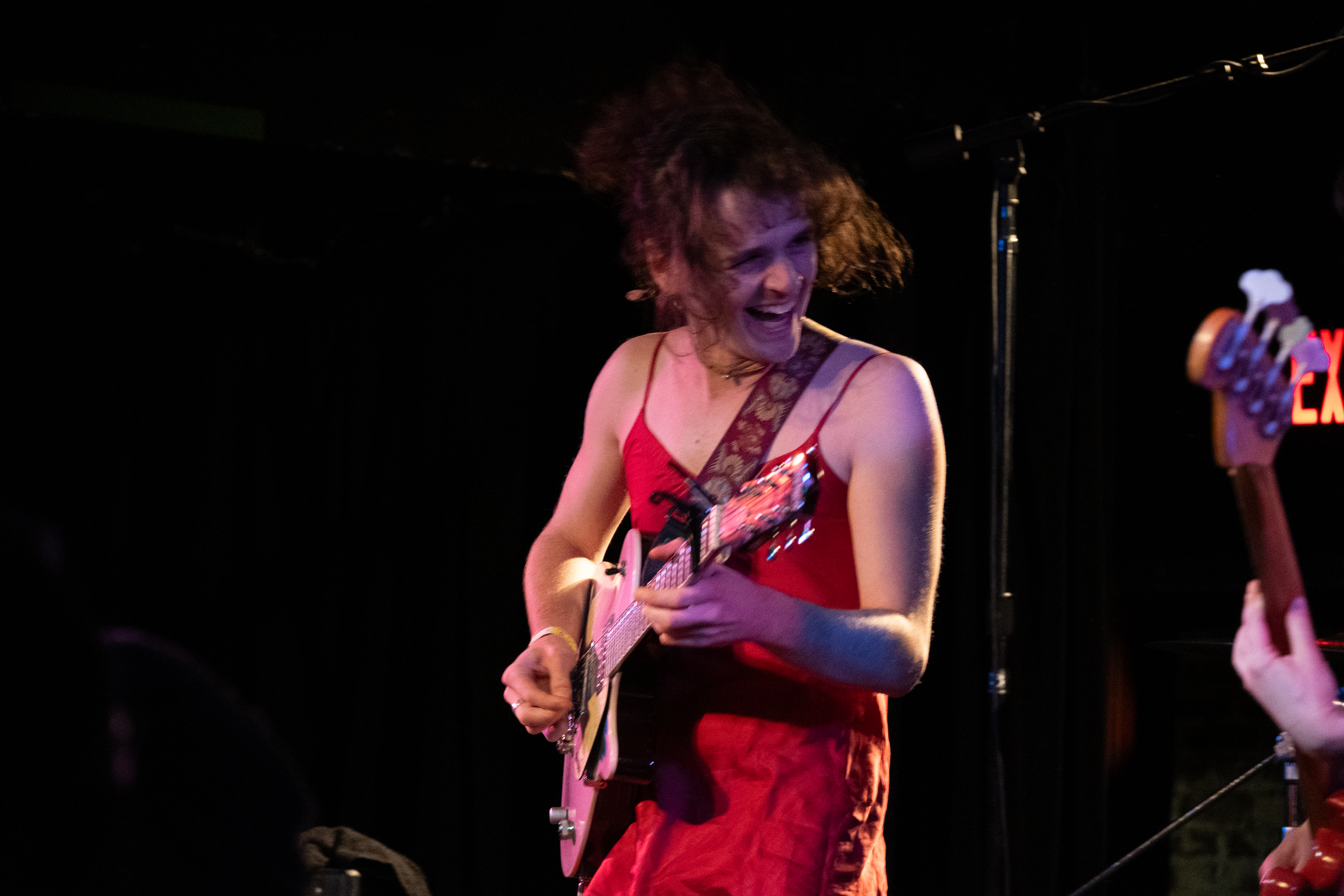
Asher White performance at Liberation Weekend 2025

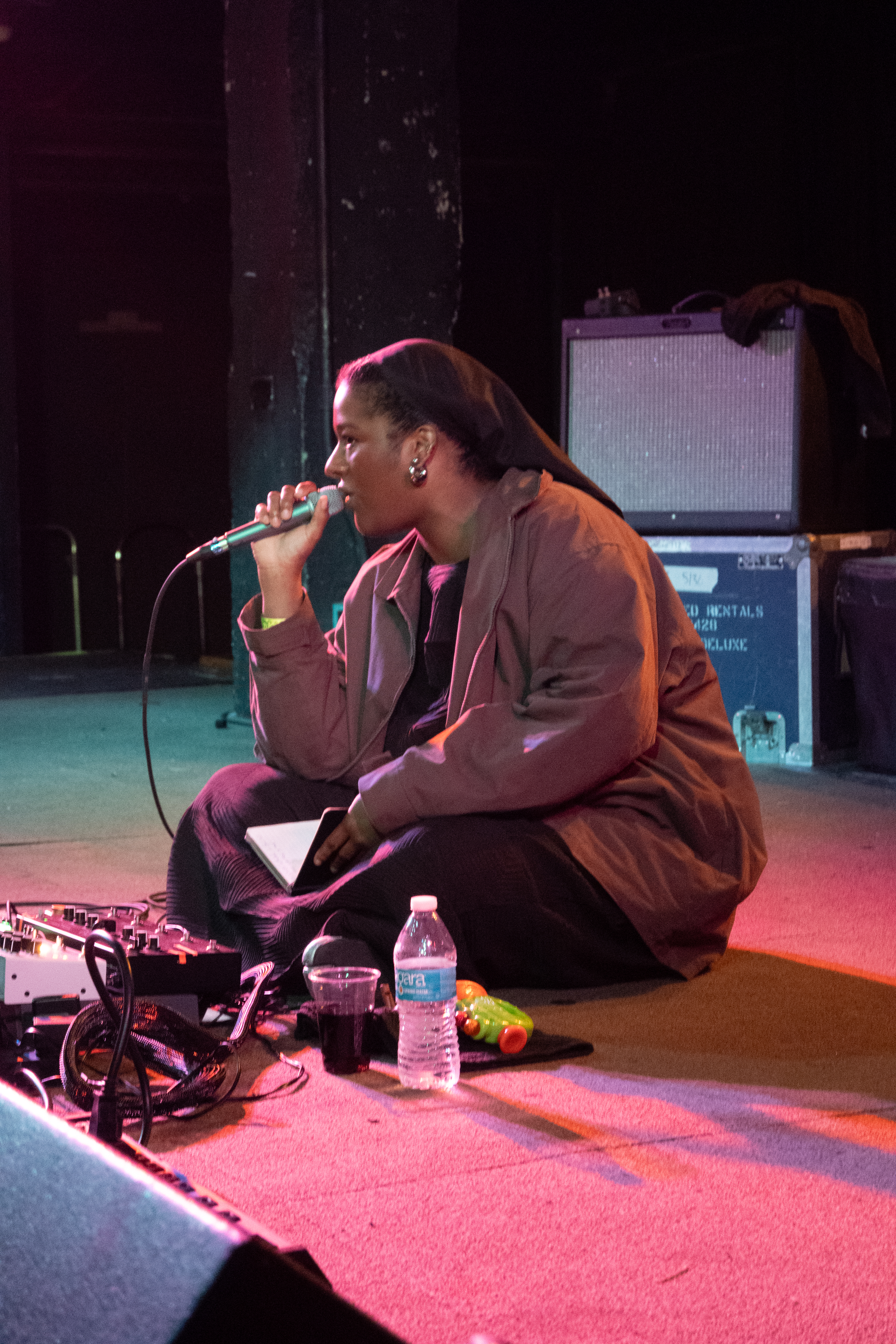
L'Rain performance at Liberation Weekend 2025

=== Performances at Liberation Weekend II ===
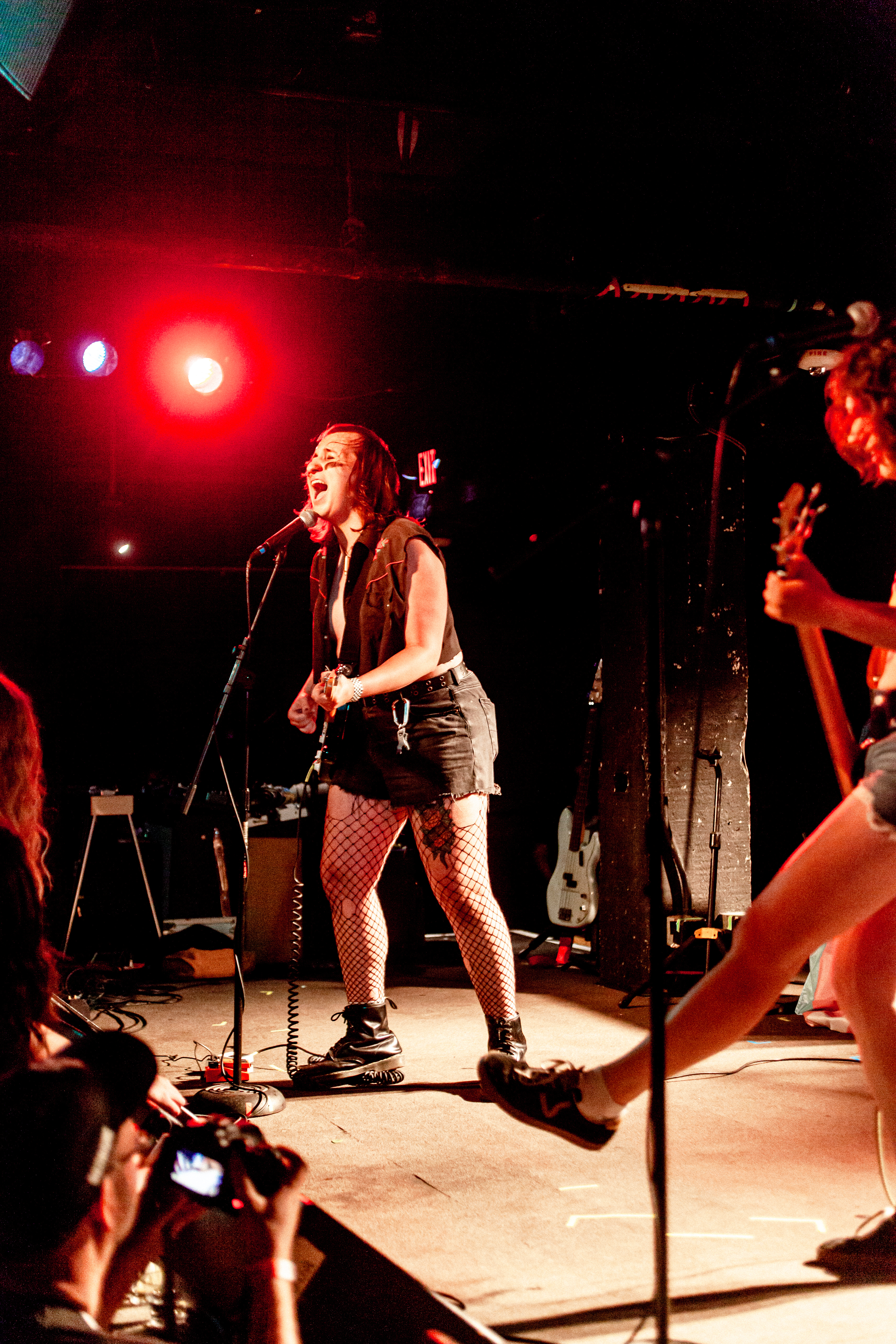
thisdogllhunt

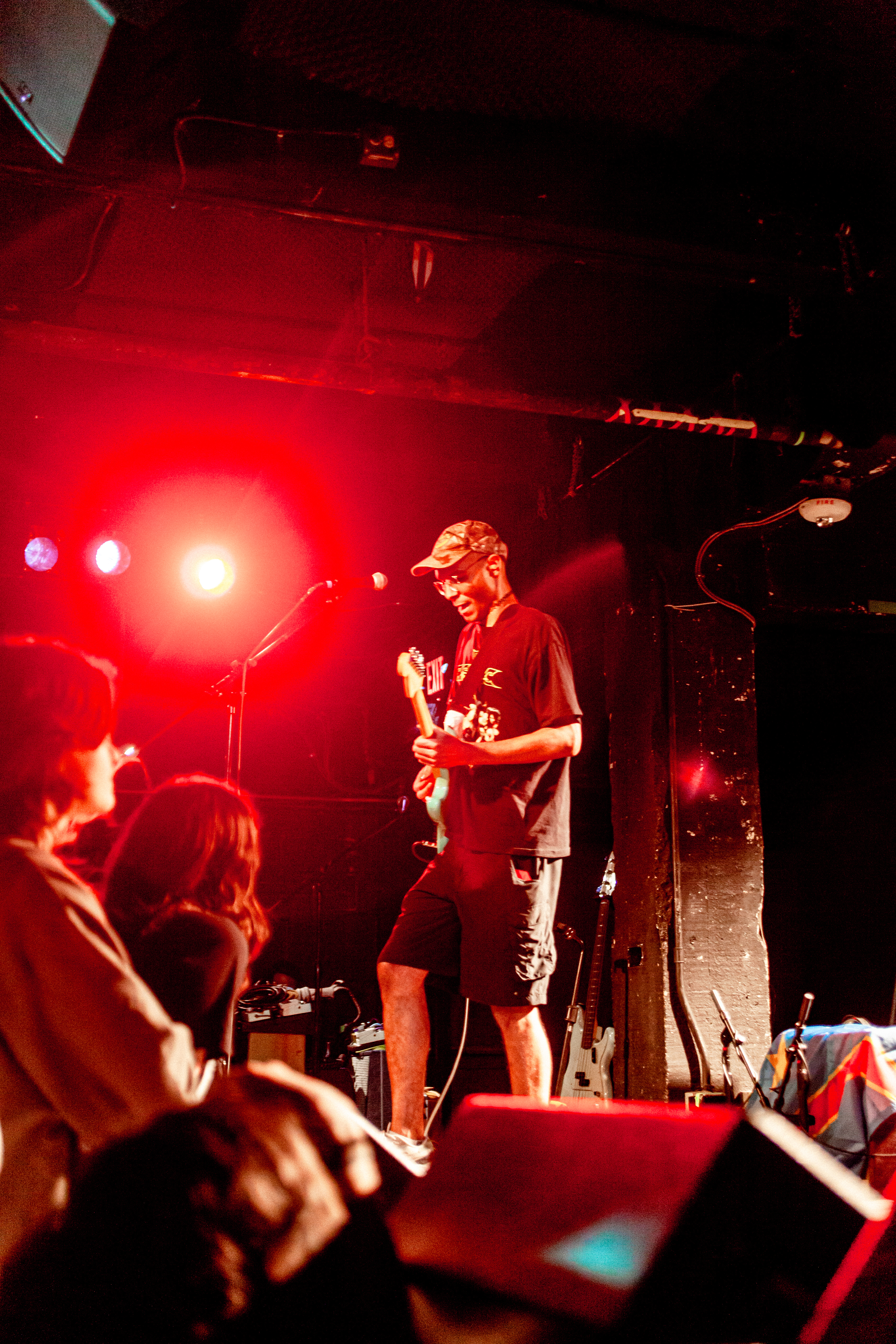
Spring Silver

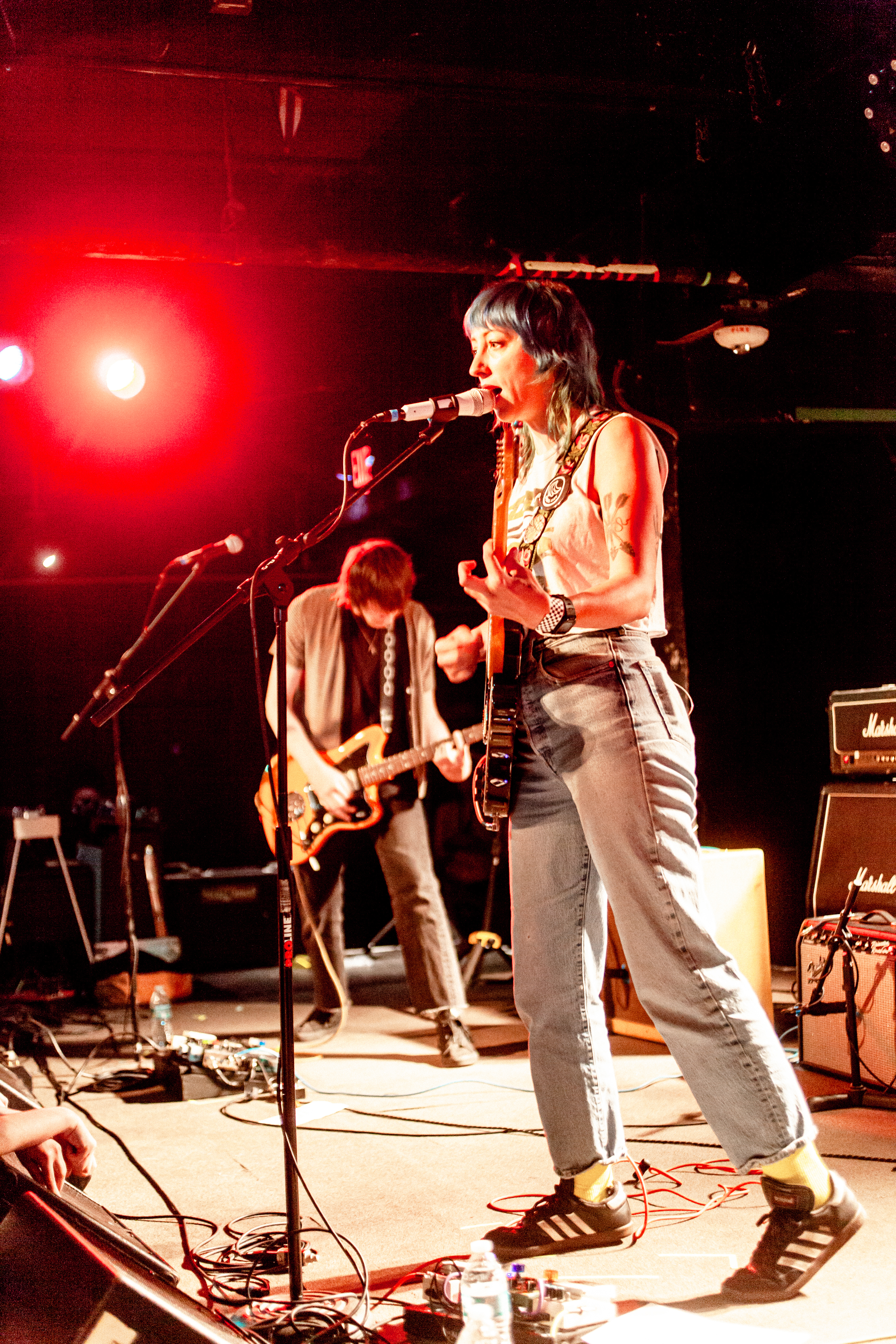
Gladie

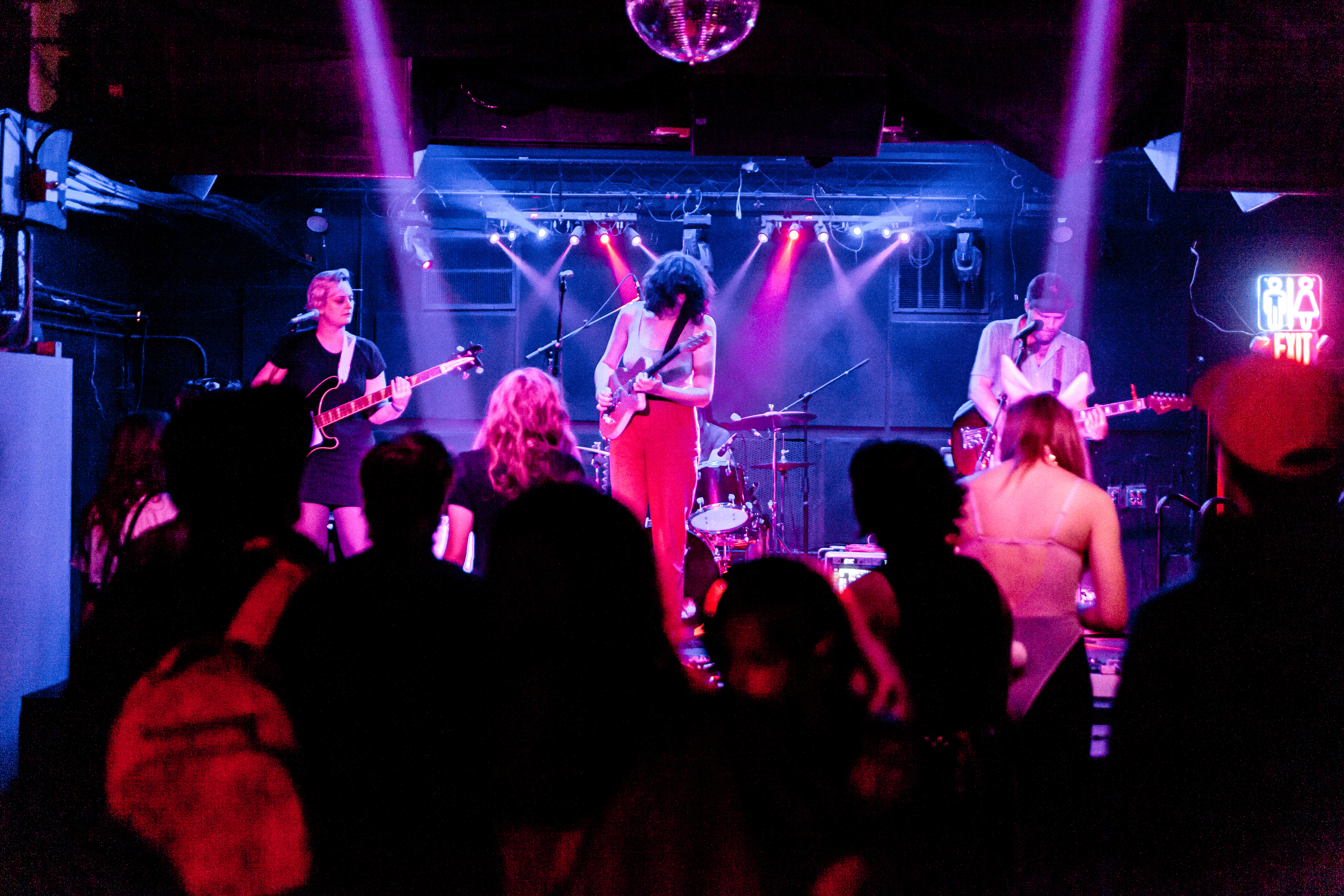
Emotional World

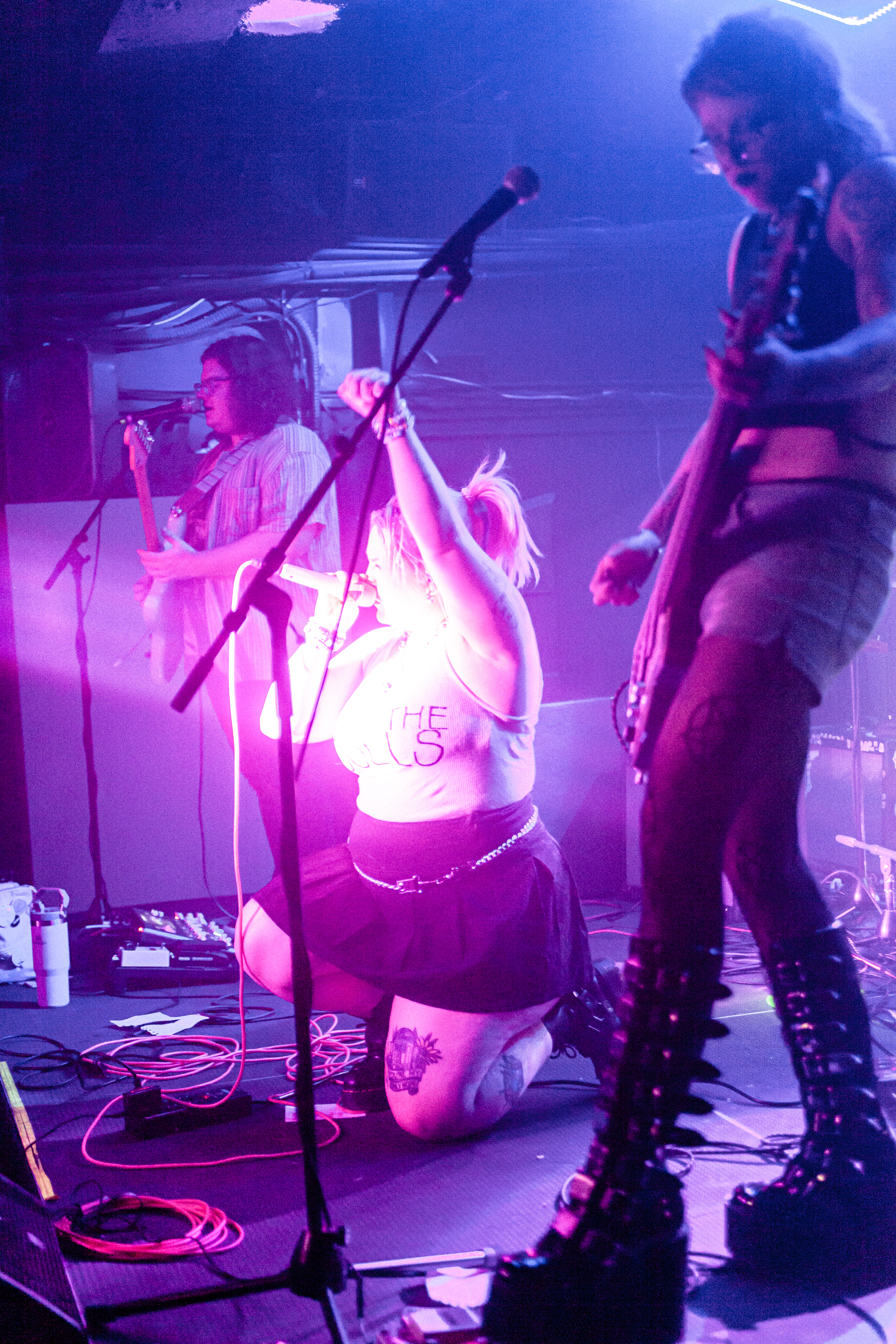
Soul Meets Body

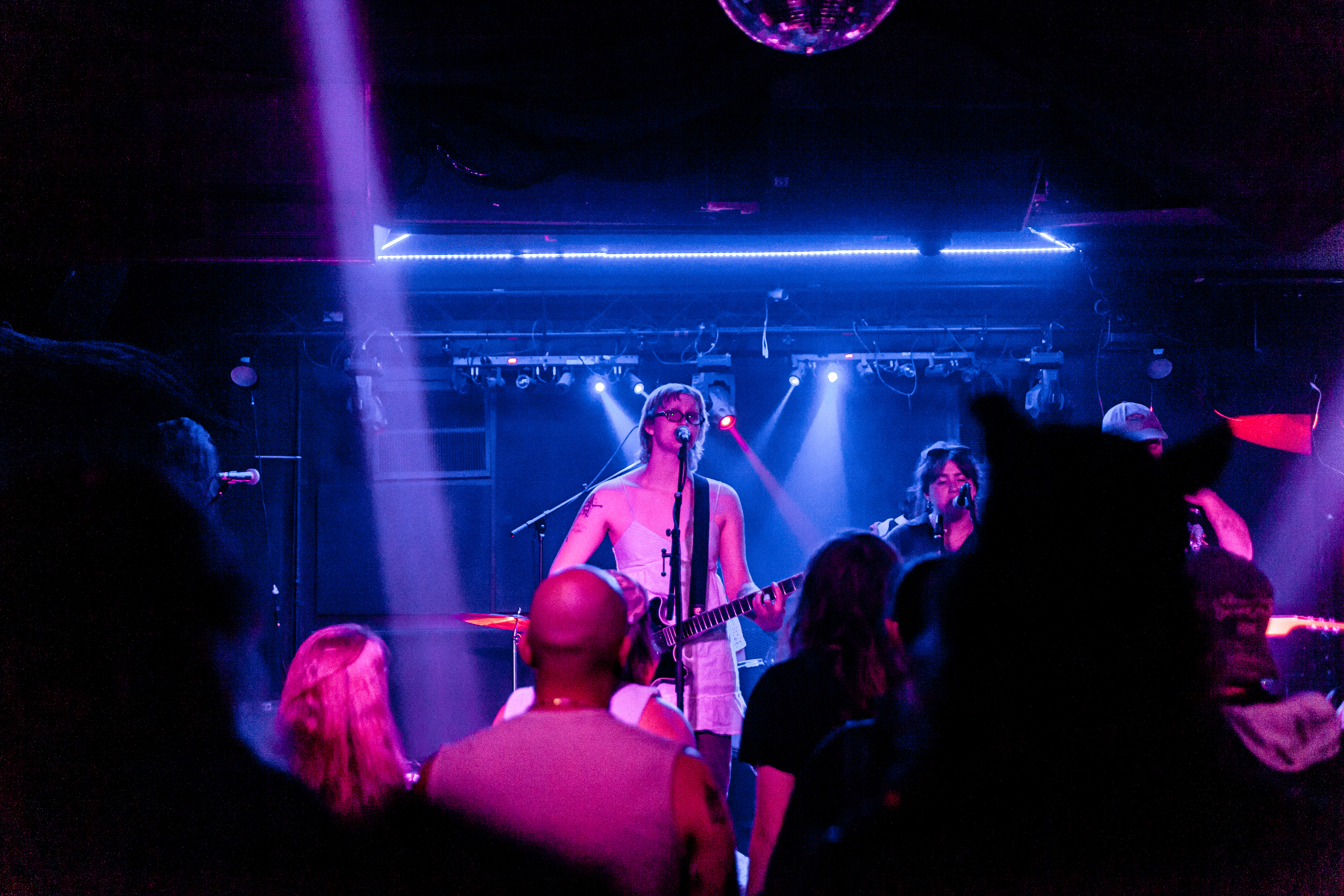
Motocrossed

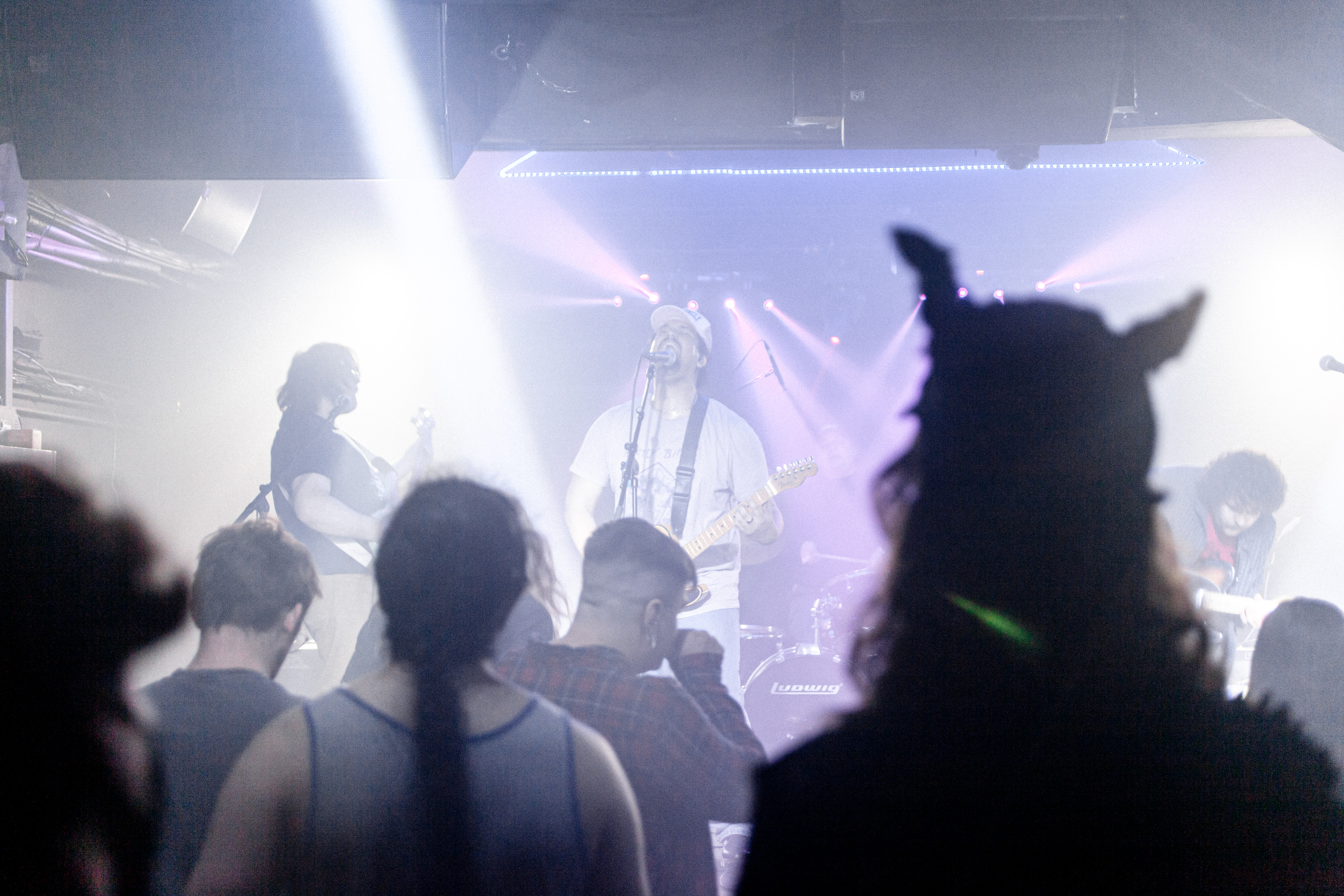
Latchkey Kids

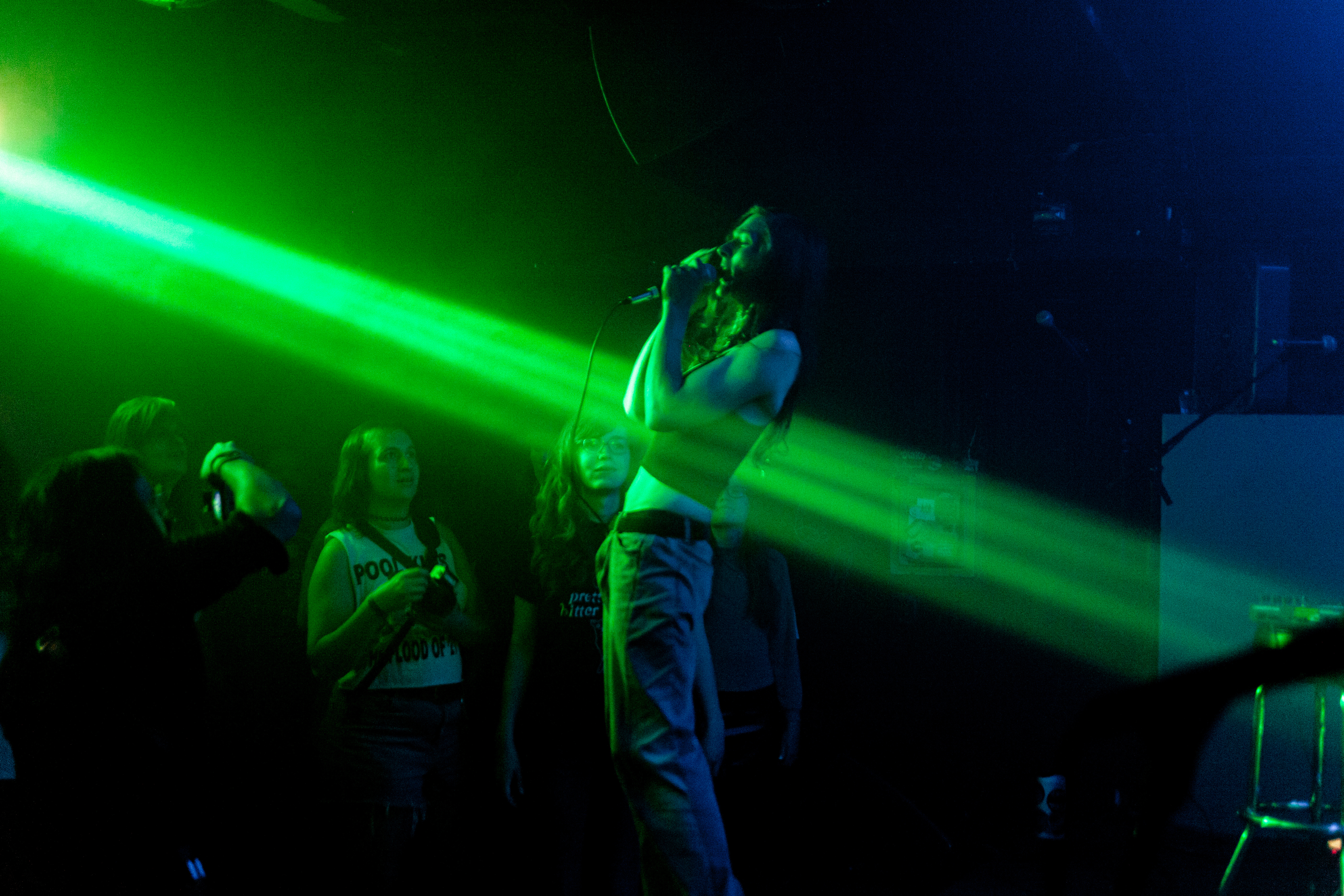
Jade Weapon

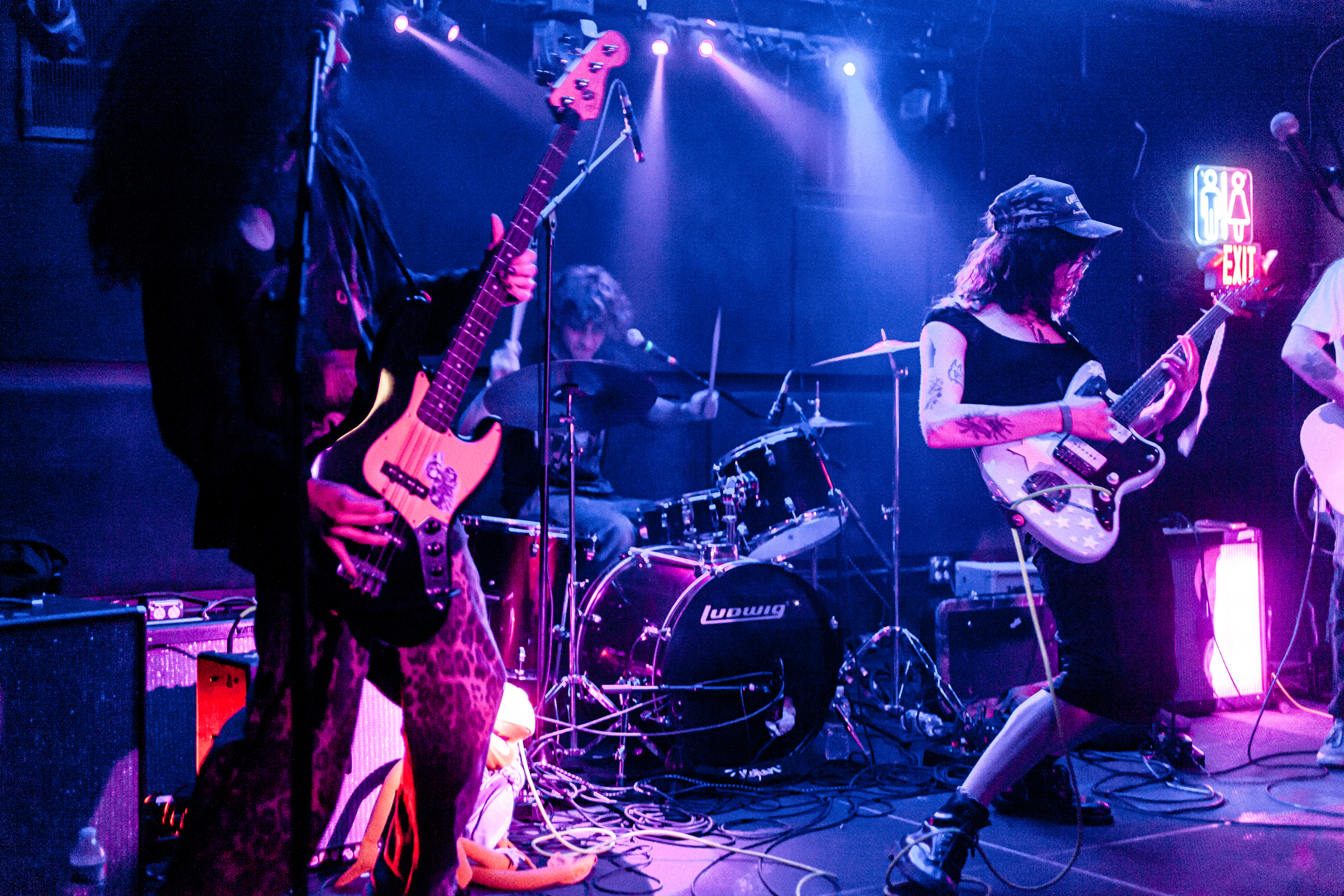
Peach Rings

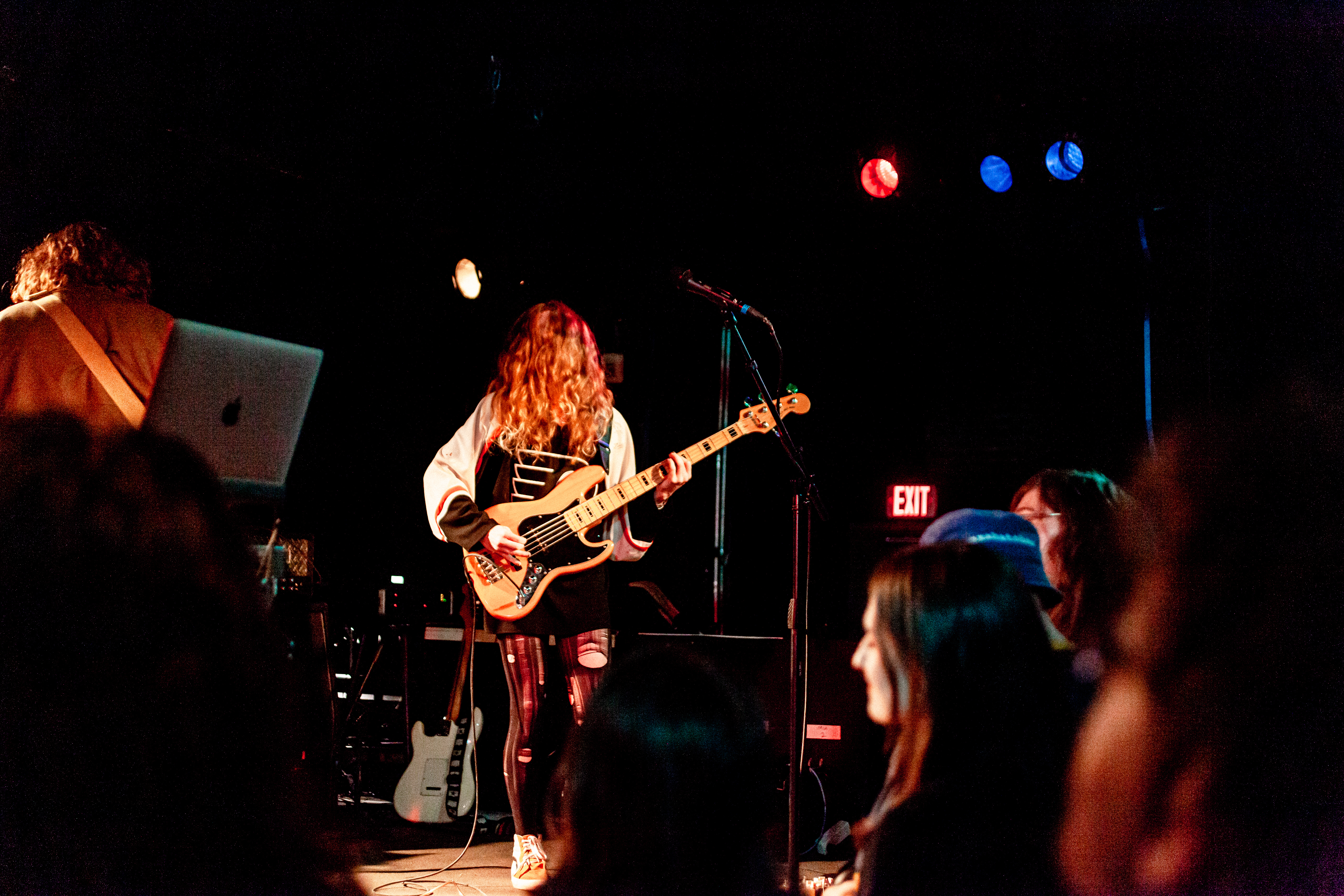
Pinky Lemon

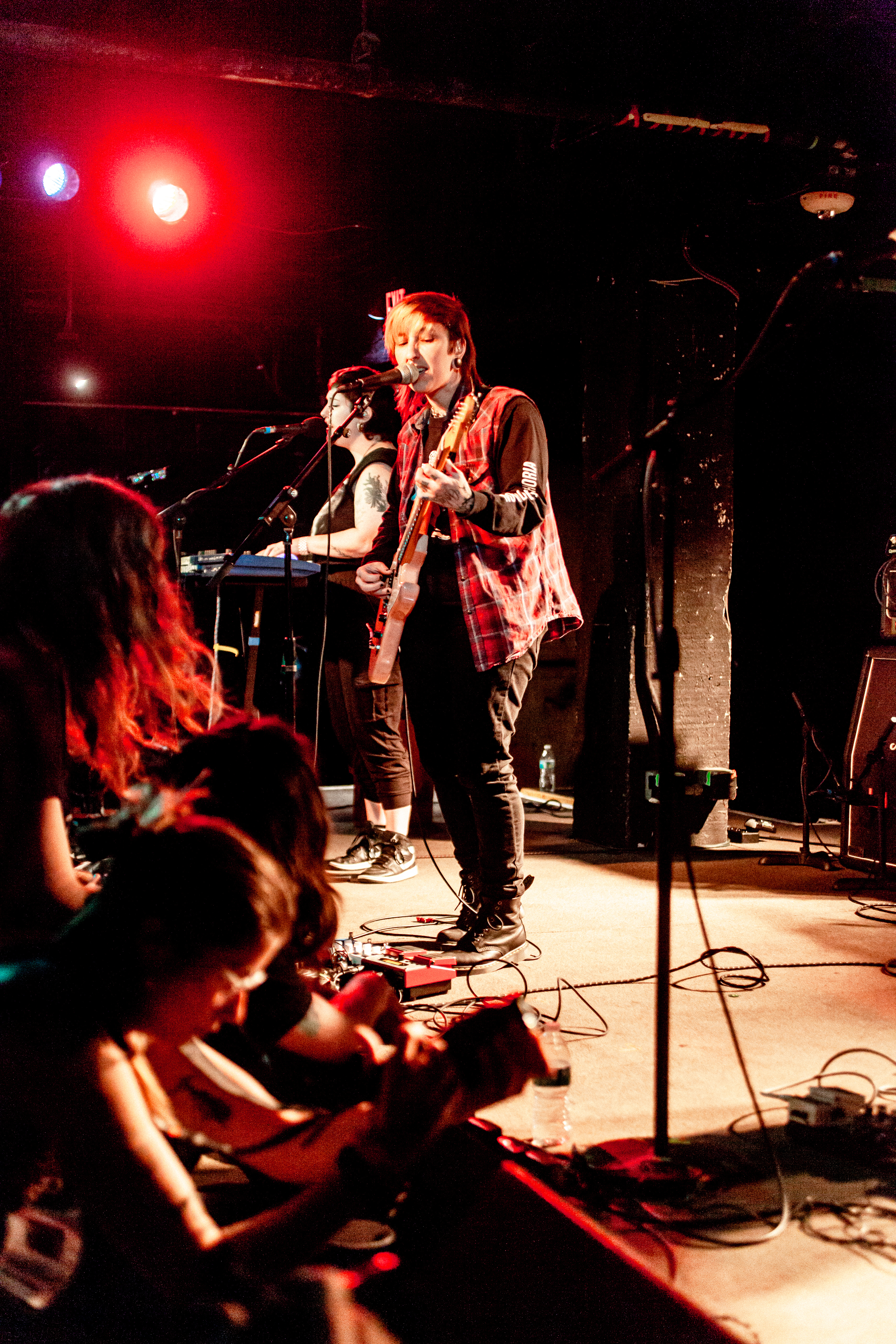
Hit Like A Girl

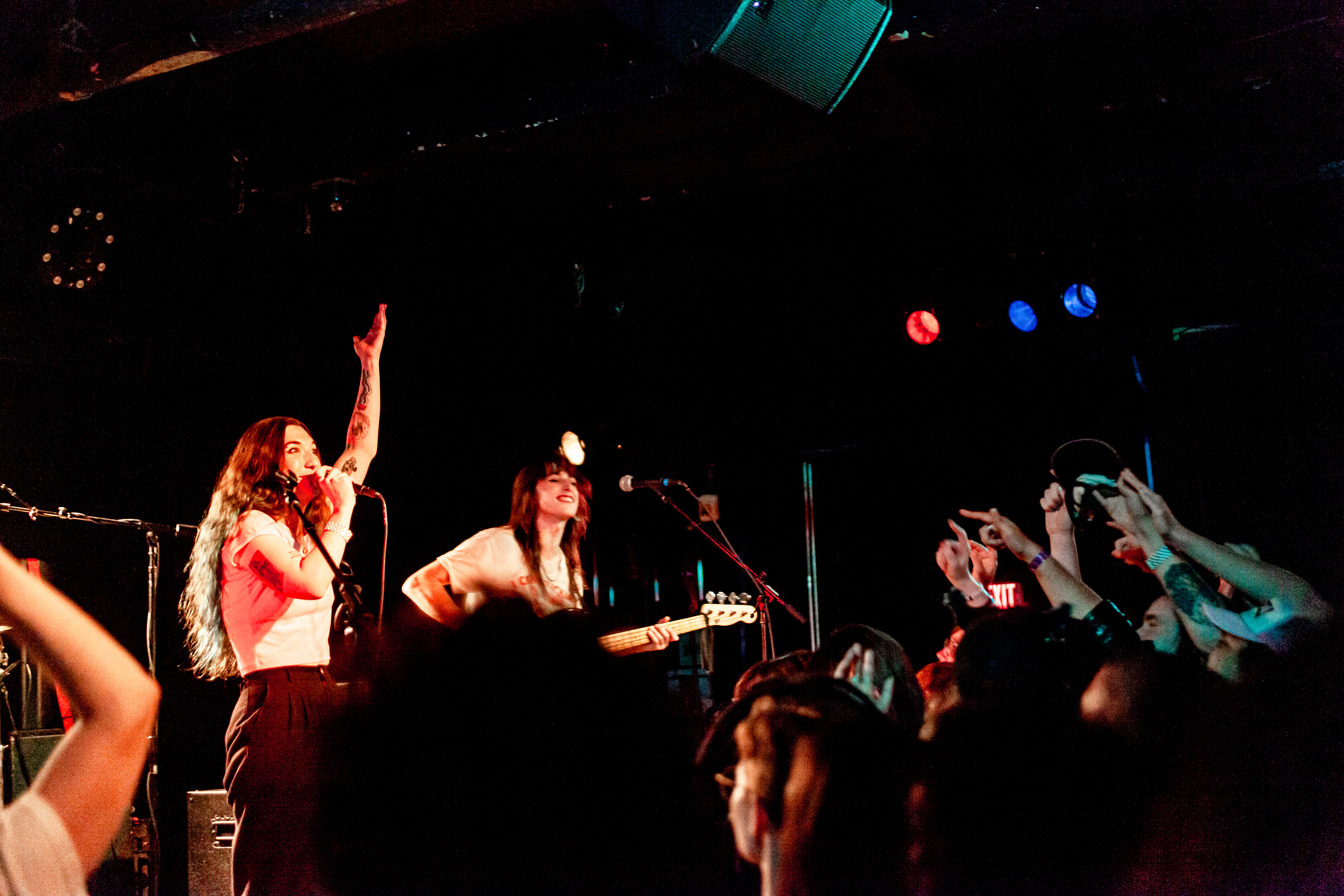
Pretty Bitter

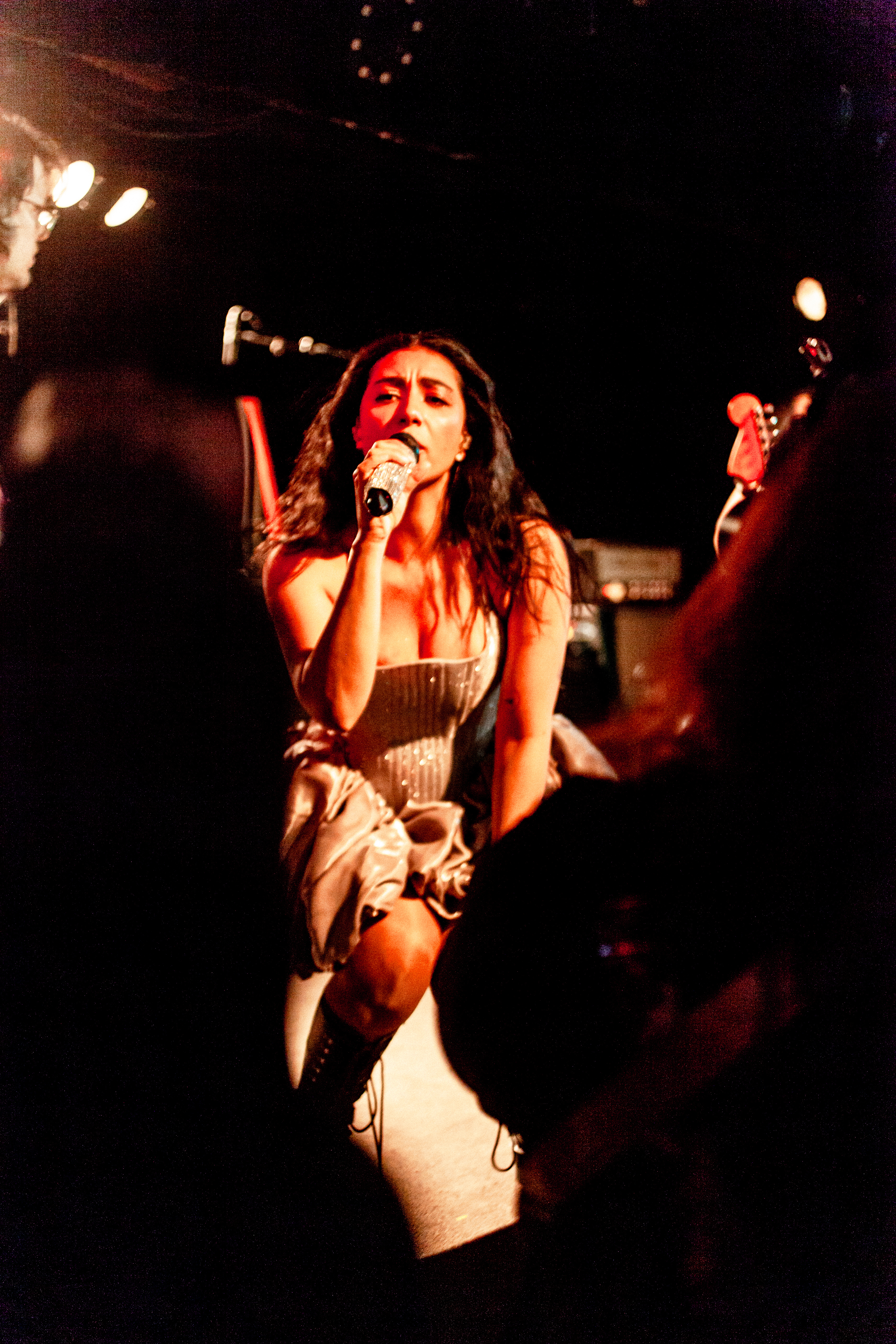
Pom Pom Squad

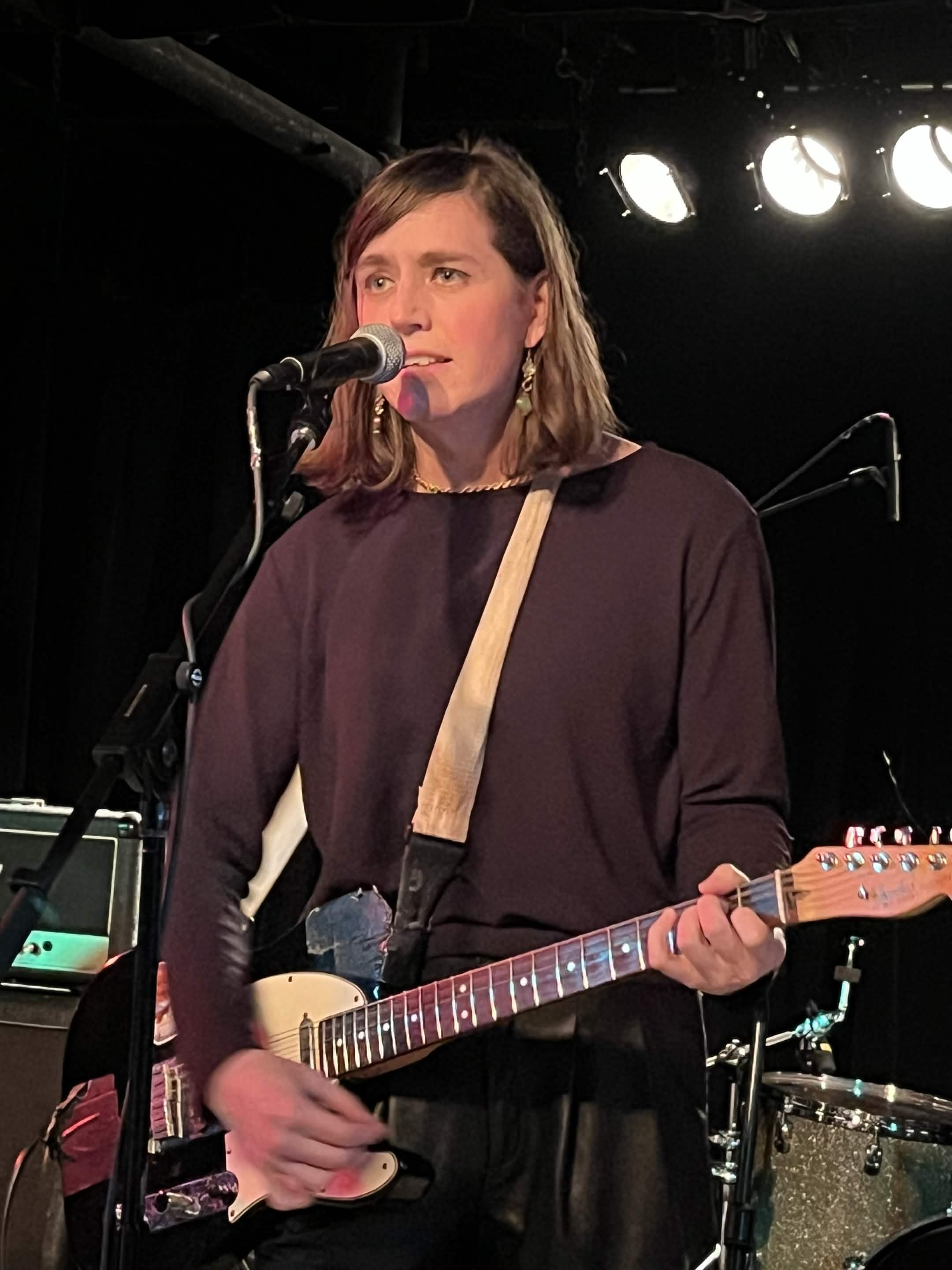
Ezra Furman
