= Asher White =

American musician

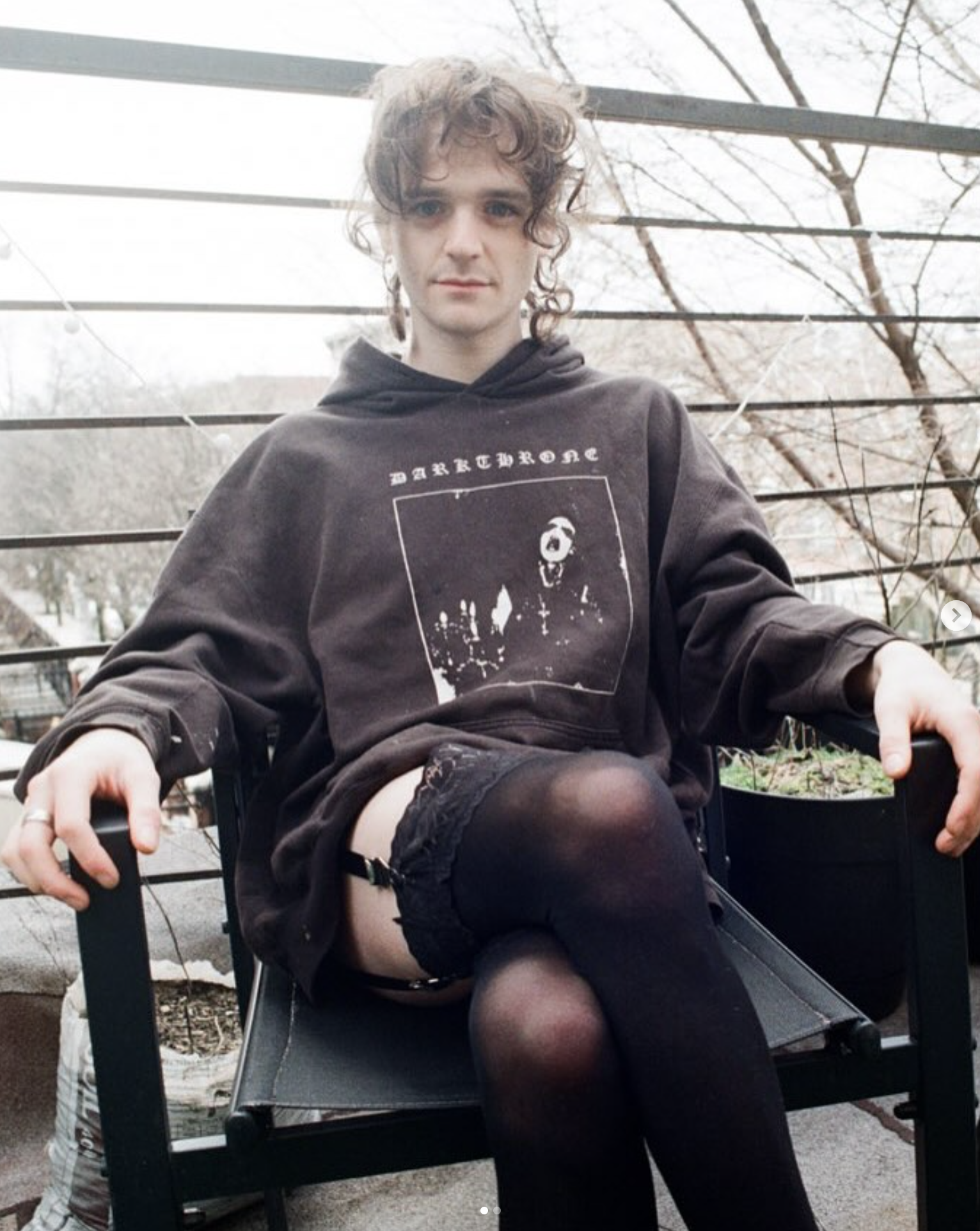

Background information
- Born: 2000 (age 25–26); Evanston, Illinois, US
- Genres: Noise pop; indie rock; indie pop; avant garde; chamber pop; folk; experimental rock
- Years active: 2014–present
- Labels: Ba Da Bing!; Joyful Noise
- Website: asherewhite.com

Asher White is an American multi-instrumentalist, producer, visual artist, and writer.

== Biography ==
White studied sculpture at the Rhode Island School of Design. White began releasing albums on Bandcamp at the age of 14, and released her fifteenth album Home Constellation Study in 2024. Andy Cush of Pitchfork described the album as extraordinary in its eclecticism.

In 2024 she spoke with MIZU on the Talkhouse podcast on the occasion of Red Hot's release of the compilation album Transa, on which she was featured.

In April 2025, White signed to the label Joyful Noise. Alongside the announcement, she released "Kratom Headache Girls Night", a single for her forthcoming album. In May 2025, she performed at Gender Liberation Movement's Liberation Weekend music festival with Ekko Astral, Speedy Ortiz, and others in Washington D.C. In September 2025, White released her sixteenth album 8 Tips for Full Catastrophe Living via Joyful Noise.

In February 2026, White released a cover album of Jessica Pratt's self titled album. In March 2026, Rolling Stone named White one of their Future 25, which honors "what’s next around the world and across all genres."

== Selected discography ==
- The Swamp (2017)
- A Home in the Country (2018)
- I Thought I Heard Them Call My Name (2019)
- Ancient Collect (2019)
- In the Quarry (2020)
- American Motel History (2021)
- Architecture Exuberant! (2022)
- New Excellent Woman (2023)
- Elmwood Cassette (2023)
- Home Constellation Study (2024)
- 8 Tips for Full Catastrophe Living (2025)
- Jessica Pratt (2026)
- Love Aggregates (2026)
