= Gladie =

American indie rock band

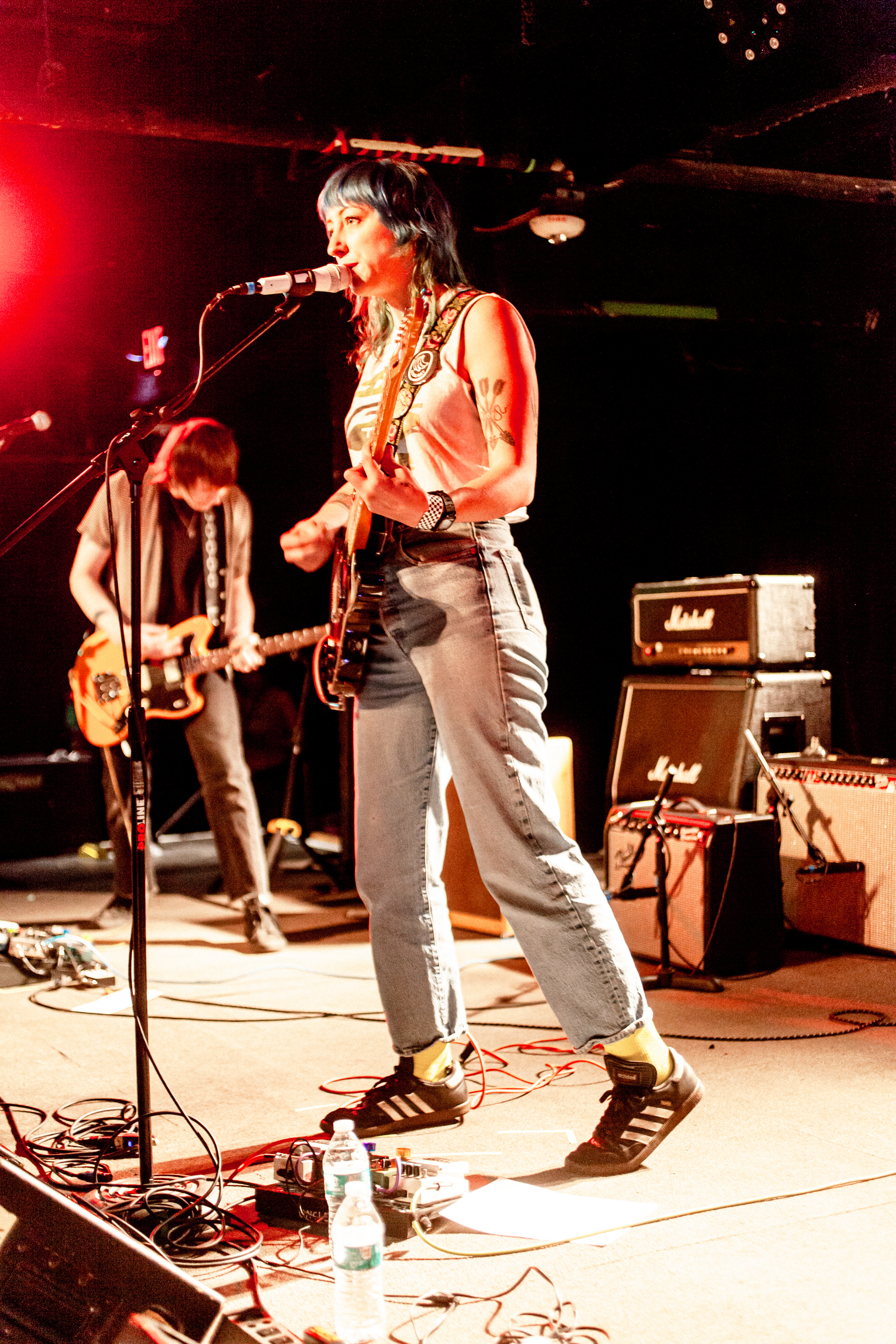
- Gladie performing at Liberation Weekend II, 2026

Background information
- Origin: Philadelphia, Pennsylvania, U.S.
- Genres: Indie rock
- Years active: 2020–present
- Labels: Lame-O Records; Plum Records
- Members: Augusta Koch; Matt Schimelfenig; Miles Ziskind; Evan Demianczyk; Liz Parsons
- Past members: Pat Conaboy; Ian Farmer; Dennis Mishko
- Website: www.gladie.net

Gladie is an American indie rock band from Philadelphia, Pennsylvania. The band consists of ex-Cayetana member Augusta Koch and ex-Three Man Cannon member Matt Schimelfenig.

== History ==
Gladie released their first album in 2020 titled Safe Sins on Lame-O Records. In 2022, Gladie released their second full-length album titled Don't Know What You're in Until You're Out on Plum Records.

It was announced the band had signed to Get Better Records in November 2025. That year they also supported Algernon Cadwallader on tour. In January 2026 it was announced the band release a third album, No Need To Be Lonely produced by Jeff Rosenstock, on March 20. With a West Coast tour with Saintseneca in March and April, and an East Coast tour with Noun in April and May.

== Members ==
In 2020 the band consisted of ex-Cayetana member Augusta Koch on guitar and vocals, ex-Three Man Cannon member Matt Schimelfenig on guitar and vocals, ex-Spirit of the Beehive member Pat Conaboy on drums, and ex-Modern Baseball member Ian Farmer on bass. In 2024 the lineup was Koch, Schimelfenig, Conaboy now on guitar, ex-Tigers Jaw member Dennis Mishko on bass, and Miles Ziskind on drums. As of November 2025 the band was Koch, Schimelfenig, Ziskind, Evan Demianczyk on bass, and Liz Parsons on backing vocals. Parsons has previously played bass live for the band.

== Discography ==
- Safe Sins (2020)
- Don't Know What You're in Until You're Out (2022)
- No Need To Be Lonely (2026)
