= Jeff Draco =

American musician

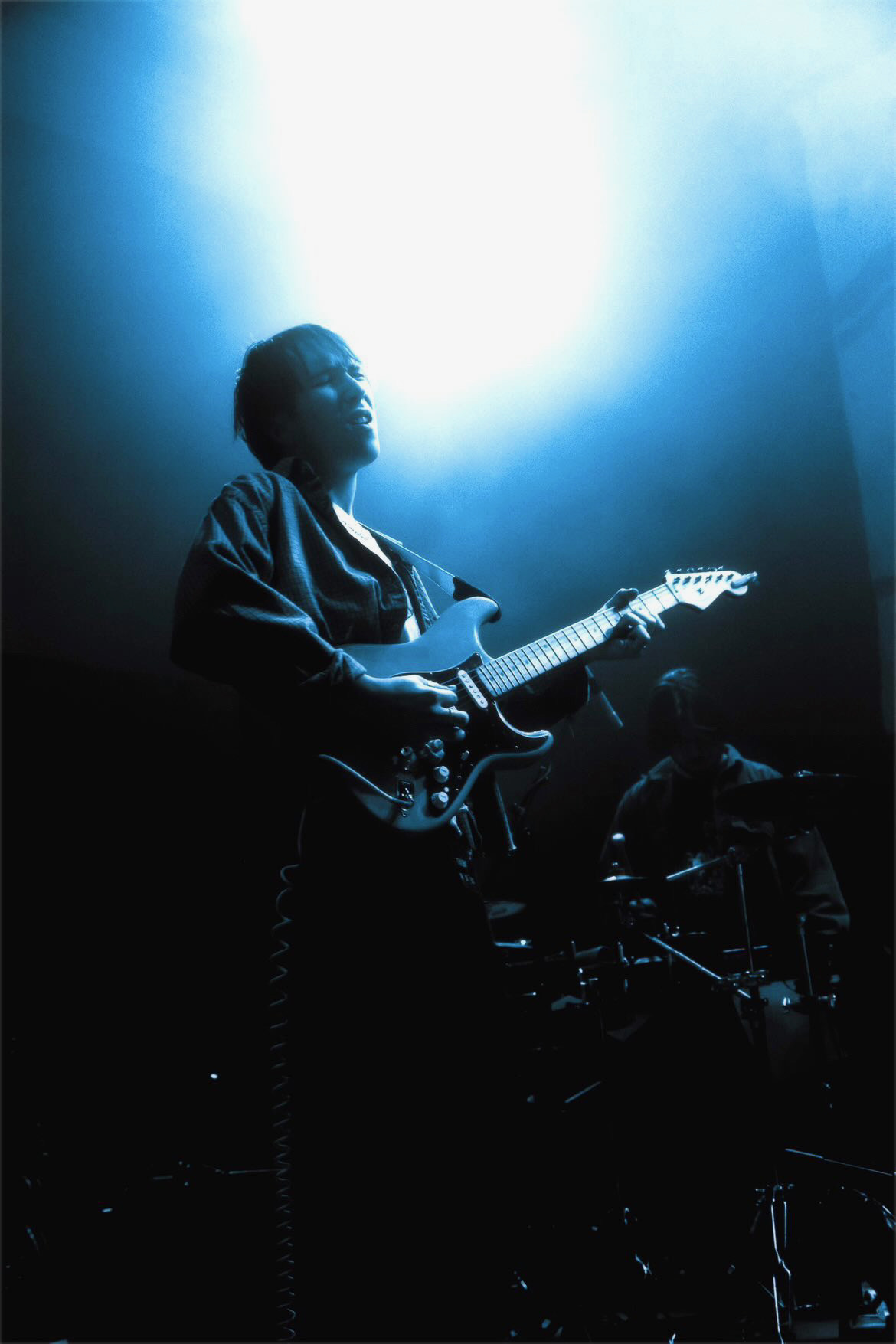
- Jeff Draco performs at 9:30 Club (2023)

Background information
- Born: Jeffrey William Gilman, Jr. March 31, 2000 (age 26); Mount Airy, Maryland, U.S.
- Genre: Indie pop · Dreampop · Surf Rock · Shoegaze
- Occupations: Singer-songwriter, producer, multi-instrumentalist
- Instruments: Vocals, guitar, bass, piano, drums, tenor saxophone
- Formerly of: STRANGER
- Website: jeffdraco.com

Jeffrey William Gilman, Jr. (born March 31, 2000), known by his stage name Jeff Draco, is an American independent singer, songwriter, producer, and multi-instrumentalist.

On February 6, 2026, Draco released a new single, "Excess." The song is Draco's first single since the September 2024 release of Attitude.

== Career ==
=== 2008–2017 ===
Gilman was interested in music from a young age.

In 2017, Gilman adopted the stage name Jeff Draco, inspired by the Draco (constellation) and the dreamier aspects of his music.

=== 2017-present ===
In March 2018, Draco released his debut single "On My Mind." Leading to the September 2018 release of his debut album, Paradise, he released two additional singles, "Don't Keep Me Waiting Around" and "Paradise."

In September 2019, he released the single, "For Too Long," and followed a month later with the song "Same Bed." The singles led to Draco's 2019 Extended play (EP), 2101, which was released on November 15, 2019.

Draco continued to release a string of singles in 2020 and 2021: "Someone You Don't Need," "Last Night," "Losing My Mind (featuring Ben Beal)" and "Just to Make You Happy," a collaboration with Skate Stance. In summer 2021, Draco released the standalone single, "Dreamgirl."

In November 2021, Jeff Draco released the single "Fall For Another Day.". In February 2022, Draco released the single "Desiderium." "Feel So Gold" arrived in May 2022. To support the singles, Draco partnered with DC9 Nightclub for a 3-show headlining residency

On July 8, 2022, Draco released his second EP, Freezing in Hollywood, which explored themes of youthful naiveté and the emotional remnants of past relationships. Draco promoted the project that summer by embarking on a U.S. East Coast tour with Vermont band Moxie. On October 27, 2022, Draco released a recorded live performance of the EP titled Freezing in Hollywood (Sunrise Sessions).

Draco made his debut at 9:30 Club, supporting The Crystal Casino Band, on February 9, 2023. He released the song "Letters" the following day, leading The Luna Collective to predict he's "on track to become the next household name in the indie music scene."

In June 2023, Draco released the single "Never Gonna Be The Same" and embarked on the Never Gonna Be The Same Tour with stops in major markets such as Richmond, Charlotte, Nashville, Atlanta, Chicago, Pittsburgh, and Wilmington. The tour culminated in a hometown show at Union Stage. Featured in Washington City Paper ahead of the tour, the newspaper noted Jeff Draco as "one of D.C.'s most popular indie artists."

Draco headlined The Atlantis (music venue) on March 30, 2024, as part of the venue's Deep Dive Live series.

== Attitude Era ==
On May 31, 2024, Draco announced the release of his third EP, Attitude, and shared the title track, "Attitude (I Want More).". Upon release, the single appeared on music blog aggregator Hype Machine's Popular Top 50, where it entered at No. 26.

Attitude was released on September 13, 2024. The project was mixed and mastered by Grammy Award-winning producer Patrick Kehrier

Highlighting the "standout" release day single, "Past Lives," Notion (magazine) opined the release "captivates with its emotional depth and soaring vocals, setting a reflective tone for an EP that captures both the nostalgia of youth and the complexities of growth."

In 2025, Jeff Draco spoke with BBC Newsbeat about the challenges of being an independent artist. The conversation was prompted following Chappell Roan’s speech at the 67th Annual Grammy Awards, where she called for better rights for musicians and donated $25,000 to Backline, a mental health and wellness charity for music industry professionals.

Sharing his past struggles with mental health as an artist, Draco shared, "Things can feel really heavy when it's your main passion, and it's like, this is the thing I love the most—why is it painful right now?" He advocated for and emphasized the need for long-term industry-wide changes to better support emerging musicians’ well-being.

== Personal ==
Jeff is a 2022 graduate of University of Maryland, College Park, where he received a Bachelor of Arts in marketing. He has three older siblings and lives in Washington, D.C.

== Discography ==
=== Albums ===
Title	Released	Format
Paradise	September 21, 2018	Digital download, streaming

=== Extended Plays ===
Title	Released	Format
2101	November 15, 2019	Digital download, streaming
Freezing in Hollywood	July 8, 2022	Digital download, streaming
Attitude	September 13, 2024	LP, digital download, streaming
