= Three Man Cannon =

American indie rock band

Three Man Cannon is an American indie rock band from Philadelphia, Pennsylvania. The band has released three full-length albums. Dennis Mishko and Pat Brier are former members of the band Tigers Jaw.

== History ==
The band released their debut album, The Sound, in 2010, followed by an EP titled Nelson. The band released a split with Lee Corey Oswald in 2013. Their second album, Pretty Many People, was released in 2014. In 2015, the band released their third full-length album titled Will I Know You Then, also through Lame-O Records. The bands fourth and latest album, self-titled, was released in 2018 through Lame-O Records.

== Discography ==
Studio albums

- Pretty Many People (2014, Lame-O Records)
- Will I Know You Then (2015, Lame-O Records)
- Three Man Cannon (2018, Lame-O Records)

EPs

- Nelson (2010, Working Man Records)

Splits

- Three Man Cannon/Lee Corey Oswald (2013)
