= Crush Fund =

American punk band

- Crush Fund in 2024

Background information
- Origin: New York City
- Genres: Punk rock; dance-punk; queercore
- Years active: 2022–present
- Labels: Blixworld Records; Lonely Ghost Records
- Members: July Brown; Nora Knox; Sean Kovacs; Wendy Kya
- Website: crushfund.bandcamp.com

Crush Fund is an American punk band based in Brooklyn, New York. Their musical style is multi-genre, with one author describing it as a mix between the "tight rock of a band like Yard Act with the unpredictable distorted pop of 100 gecs."

== History ==
Crush Fund formed in 2022, initially consisting of Knox and Kya for the first six months. Brown later joined the group and the band released their debut EP, Drama, in November 2022.

On 4 April 2024, Crush Fund released their second EP, New Fixation, via Blixworld Records. Kya recorded, produced, and engineered the EP with Olive Faber (co-founder and drummer of the American rock band Sunflower Bean). Later that same month, Crush Fund performed as a headlining act at the 27th annual MACROCK music festival in Harrisonburg, Virginia.

In February 2026, Crush Fund released the single "FFS" via Bandcamp with proceeds benefiting ICE relief funds and various mutual aid organizations including the Urban Justice Center. In April 2026, Crush Fund performed at the LGBTQ+ music festival, Liberation Weekend II, in Washington D.C.

In June 2026 Crush Fund announced that they would be releasing their debut album, GO, via Lonely Ghost Records. The album is slated to release on 31 July 2026 and will consist of twelve tracks, including the previously released single "FFS". The new song "OPEN SECRET" was released to coincide with the announcement.

Crush Fund members describe themselves as a "fake punk girl band", commentating on both gender essentialism and punk rock genre essentialism. The majority of band members are trans women. Their music and performances often address topics related to transgender identity, LGBTQ community, and queer rights.

== Members ==
=== Current members ===
- July Brown – bass (2022–present)
- Nora Knox – drums, vocals (2022–present)
- Sean Kovacs
- Wendy Kya – guitar, vocals (2022–present)

== Discography ==
=== Studio albums ===
- GO (2026)

=== Extended plays ===
- Drama (2022)
- New Fixation (2024)
