= Pretty Bitter =

American synth pop band

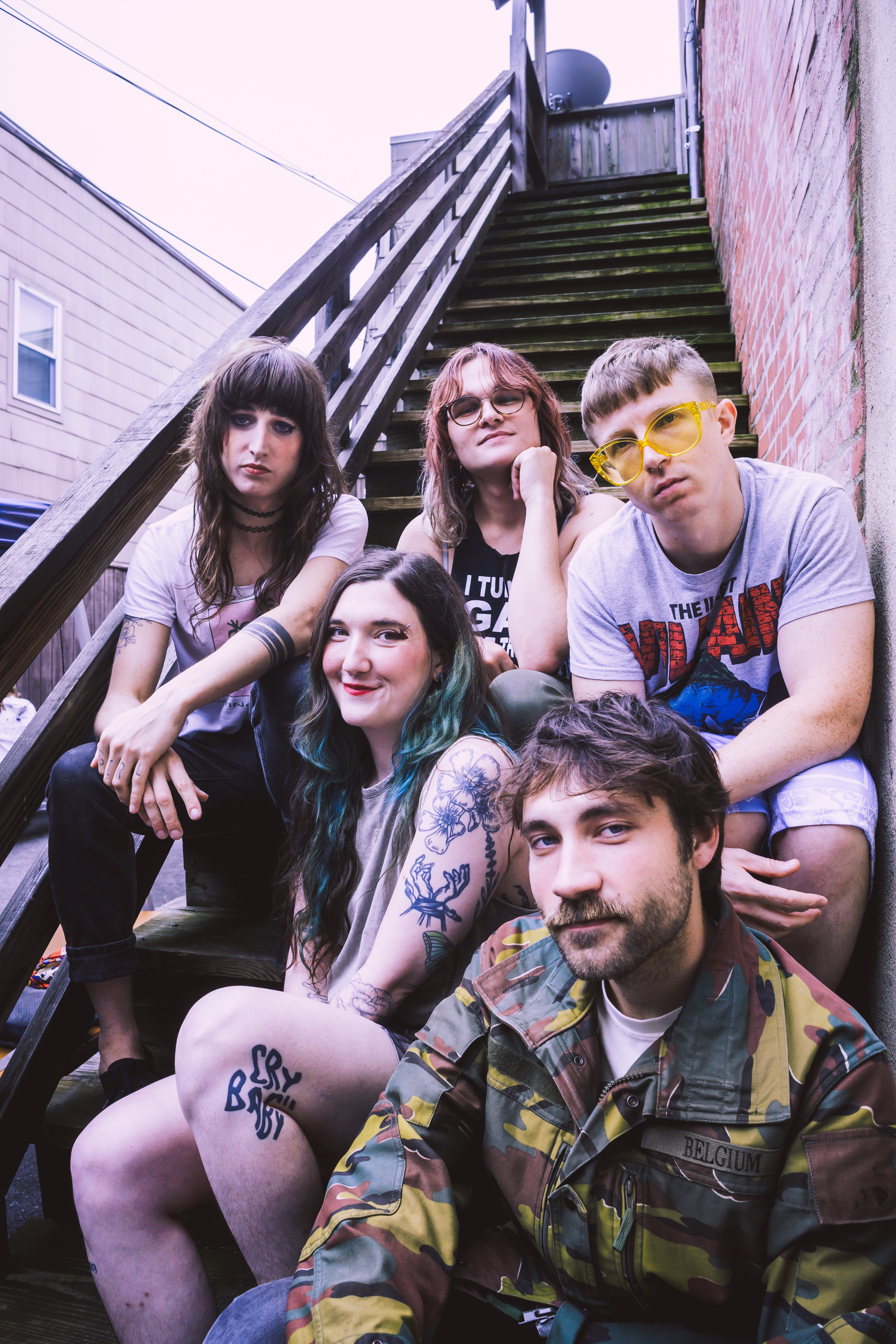
- Pretty Bitter in 2025. From left to right: (top row) Tyler, Campbell, Hayes, (bottom row) Bleker, Hughes.

Background information
- Origin: Washington, D.C.
- Genres: synth pop; indie pop; power pop; indie rock; emo; shoegaze
- Years active: 2020–present
- Labels: Blossöm Records; Tiny Engines
- Members: Mel Bleker; Miri Tyler; Jason Hayes; Kira Campbell
- Past members: Chris Smith; Zack Be; Liam Hughes

Pretty Bitter is an indie synth pop band based in Washington, D.C. Their third full-length album, Pleaser, was released on July 25, 2025, via Tiny Engines.

== History ==
Pretty Bitter was formed in Washington, D.C. after a creative partnership formed between Mel Bleker and Miri Tyler in 2017. Prior to the conception of Pretty Bitter, some members of the band were involved in the project Nah. from 2015-2019, and during that time released a record titled Patchwork via Blossöm Records. After Nah.'s dissolution, Pretty Bitter formed and developed a local following, performing with notable bands such as The Ophelias and Sunflower Bean.

The production of Pretty Bitter's first full-length album, Hinges, was affected by the COVID-19 pandemic in 2020. The album began as a series of demos that were recorded remotely due to social distancing measures. These measures also resulted in many revisions for lyrics on some songs, due to Bleker's struggles in writing while isolated from people. Hinges was released on June 24, 2022, via Blössom Records. To celebrate the album, Pretty Bitter played a record release concert at Comet Ping Pong on July 1. Hinges is considered more synth pop, while also embracing styles such as grunge, indie folk, shoegaze, pop punk, indie rock, and power pop. The album's songs included a number of themes centering topics such as mental illness, identity, and relationships. Hinges received positive reviews with one critic calling it a "ten track masterpiece", praising its catchy songs and high level of musicianship. The Washington Area Music Association (WAMA) named Pretty Bitter's Hinges as Best Pop Album and the song "The Damn Thing Is Cursed" as Best Pop Song in the 2023 Wammie Music Awards.

In February 2024, Pretty Bitter released a new single "Roadkill". Later that year, Pretty Bitter teamed with Washington, D.C. rock band Flowerbomb and producers Evan Weiss and Simon Small of Storm Chasers LTD and Type One Studios in Chicago to release the split EP Take Me Out on August 1, 2024. The album comprises five songs, with two original songs from each band and a final, collaborative song written and performed by both groups. The album is characterized by genres such as emo, indie rock, alt rock, indie pop, and dream pop. Take Me Out received positive reviews, with several critics noting the complementary pairing of Pretty Bitter and Flowerbomb and the spotlighting of the bands' respective talents. The Washington City Paper named Take Me Out as "Best Sonic Pairing" for its Best of D.C.™ 2024: Arts & Entertainment list.

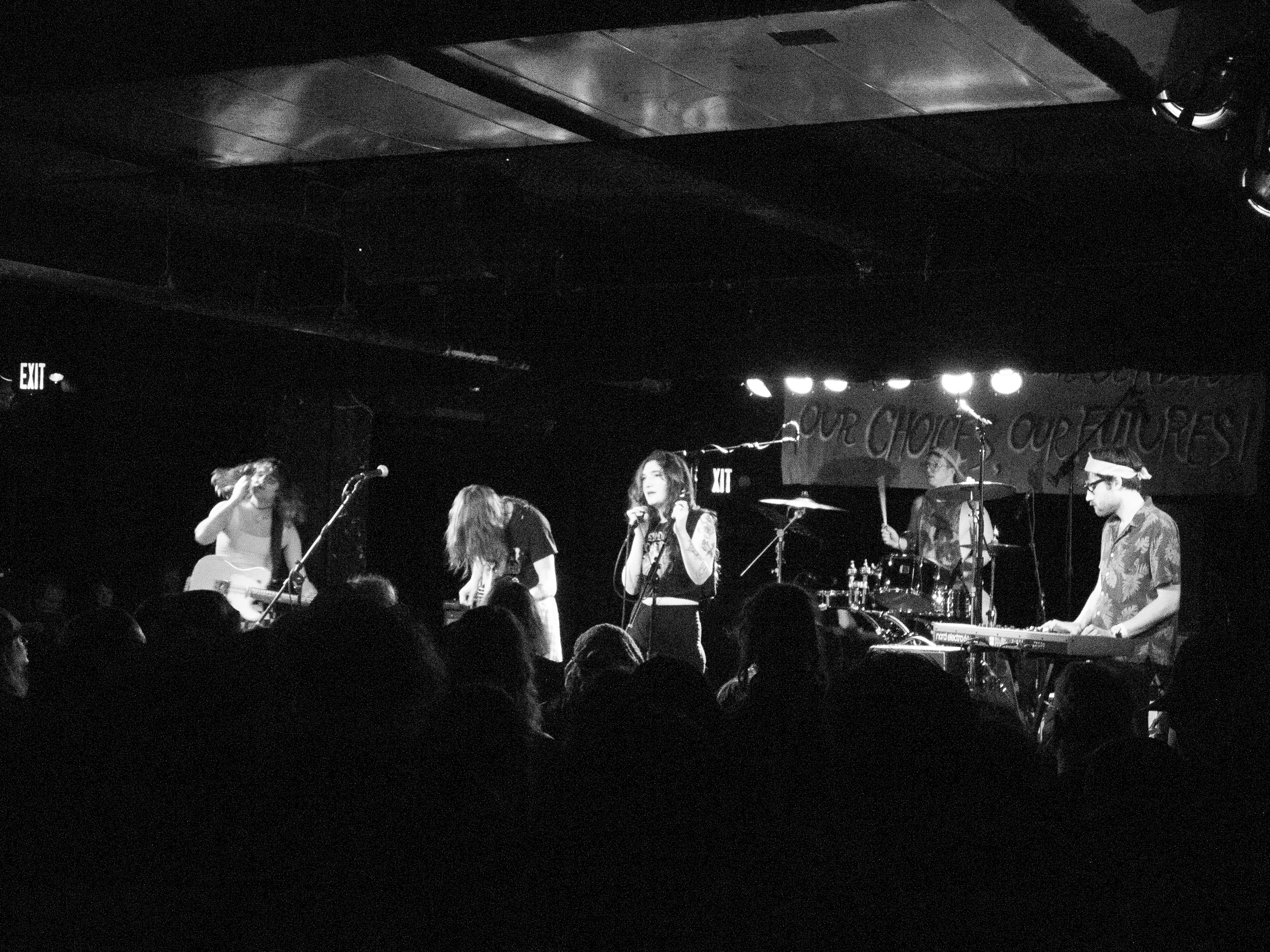
Pretty Bitter performing at Liberation Weekend in 2025. From left to right: Campbell, Tyler, Bleker, Hayes, Hughes.

Pretty Bitter has used their music to aid in various activist efforts. In January 2025, Pretty Bitter joined local Washington D.C. musicians (such as Dorinda, Pinky Lemon, Flowerbomb, Massie, and Spring Silver) to participate in Mosh Madness, a DIY music festival and charity basketball tournament that raised money for the non-profit Palestine Children's Relief Fund. In March of the same year, they played at the third annual My Body My Festival hosted by Songbyrd Music House, raising money for the DC Abortion Fund. Pretty Bitter contributed one song (titled, "The Catalog") to a compilation album (Plenty Happening) that featured tracks from 27 Washington D.C. bands/artists. The album was released on May 9, 2025, with all proceeds benefiting gender affirming care at the Whitman-Walker Health community health center. Pretty Bitter also performed at Liberation Weekend in May 2025, a music and arts festival that raised money for transgender activism via the non-profit organization, Gender Liberation Movement.

In May 2025, Pretty Bitter announced their next full-length album Pleaser, to be released in July via Tiny Engines, again partnering with Evan Weiss and Simon Small as producers. The announcement coincided with the release of the single "Thrill Eater" along with an accompanying music video. "Thrill Eater" was featured on that week's Pitchfork Selects Playlist. A second single from the album, "Outer Heaven Dude Ranch", was released in June with an accompanying music video. A third single from the album, "Bodies Under The Rose Garden", was released in July. Pleaser was released on July 25, 2025. As their second full-length album, it is their first LP with professional studio involvement (vocals were tracked at Type One Studio in Chicago, drums at The Hangar Studio in Columbia, Maryland). It is also the first LP in which Bleker wrote their own vocal melodies. The album contains themes related to aging, death, friends, love, and how time shapes the experience of emotions. Pleaser has received positive reviews, with critics noting Pretty Bitter's continuation of producing "uplifting, vibrant pieces of music" with emotional, "ghostly lyricism" while still evolving and growing as a band. The album consists of ten tracks and is 35 minutes long. Pretty Bitter celebrated the debut of Pleaser with an album release show at the Washington D.C. nightclub, Black Cat, on August 16.

== Style and influences ==
Pretty Bitter has referred to themselves as a "synth pop gumball machine" and their style as "queer alternative emo dream pop-ish". Their sound spans multiple genres, often mixing and matching styles that include synth pop, grunge, indie folk, shoegaze, and others. Their albums are often characterized by distorted instrumentation, prominent baselines, multi-layered vocals, guitar breakdowns, and catchy lyrics. Lyrics tend to be emotional, inspired by personal topics such as mental disorders (depression, body dysmorphia, trauma, eating disorders), queer identity, and family.

== Members ==
=== Current members ===
- Mel Bleker – lead vocals (2020–present)
- Miri Tyler – bass, vocals (2020–present)
- Jason Hayes – drums (2020–present)
- Kira Campbell – guitar (2024–present)

=== Past members ===
- Chris Smith – guitar (2020–2024)
- Zack Be – keyboard, guitar, banjo, vocals (2020–2025, 2026)
- Liam Hughes – keyboard (2025–2026)

== Discography ==
=== Full-Length albums ===
- Hinges (Blossöm Records, 2022)
- Pleaser (Tiny Engines, 2025)

=== EPs ===
- Take Me Out, split EP with Flowerbomb (2024)
