= DC9 Nightclub =

Nightclub/restaurant in Washington DC

Coordinates: 38.91675°N 77.02425°W

DC9 Nightclub is a nightclub and restaurant in the Shaw neighborhood of Washington, D.C. It is known for its indie music scene, dance parties, and karaoke. DC9 has a capacity of 250 people and is a venue for live music and DJs.

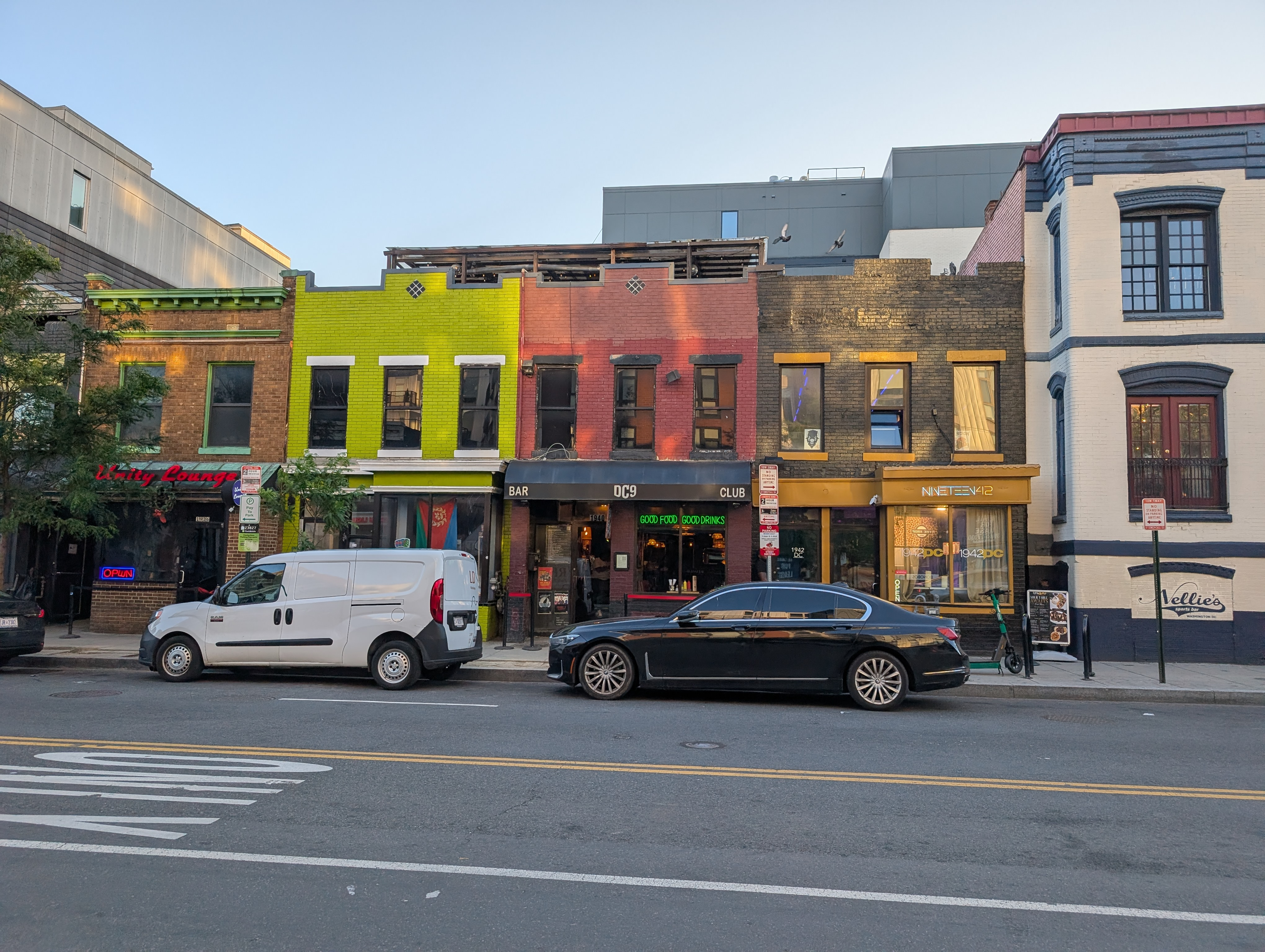
DC9 Nightclub seen from across 9th Street Northwest

== History ==
DC9 was established in 2004 in at 1940 Ninth Street, Northwest in Shaw. Co-owner Bill Spieler, a DJ, launched the business with Joe Englert and other industry members. Spieler's wife, Amber Bursik is the venue chef and assists Spieler with operational management. Steve Lambert became the booker in late 2006. In 2007, general manager Josh Copeland joined DC9. It is a two-story space formerly occupied by Metro Cafe. Before that, the space contained Club Hollywood and Asylum. DC9 features musicians from the indie music scene. The venue is mostly known for hosting indie rock bands, with a shift towards hosting house music events in its recent runnings. The venue is not known as a gay club, however the venue does attract a wide audience of customers through its variance in events. DC9 hosts karaoke and dance parties. In 2010, a man who had thrown a brick in the venue's window died after being restrained by five DC9 employees. After being initially charged with homicide, Metropolitan Police dropped all charges. In 2018, DC9 began hosting pop-up bars.

It contains a narrow saloon bar with a digital jukebox on the ground floor. The upstairs is a double-wide concert room. There is a glass-enclosed rooftop bar that opened in 2010. DC9 has a no-phone policy at its DJ events and encourages people to check in the phones with their coats.

DC9 shut down operations on March 16, 2020, during the COVID-19 pandemic, to comply with the D.C suspension of on-site operations of nightlife venues. The club gradually re-opened their restaurant services, beginning with take-out and outdoor dining, when dining restrictions loosened on June 22, 2020.

In 2024, to celebrate the venue’s 20th anniversary, Bill Spieler organized a week-long, 4 show series that celebrated the venue’s history. The series showcased and honored bands that have performed in the past, and highlighted performers in the present and future.
