= Infrastructure Investment and Jobs Act =

Legislation of the 117th United States Congress

- Long title: An act to authorize funds for Federal-aid highways, highway safety programs, and transit programs, and for other purposes.
- Acronyms (colloquial): IIJA
- Nicknames: Bipartisan Infrastructure Law (BIL)
- Enacted by: the 117th United States Congress
- Effective: November 15, 2021
- Number of co-sponsors: 5

Citations
- Public law: Pub. L. 117–58 (text) (PDF)
- Statutes at Large: 135 Stat. 429

Codification
- Titles amended: 23 U.S.C.: Highways; 46 U.S.C.:Shipping; 49 U.S.C.: Transportation
- Agencies affected: Department of Transportation (USDOT)

Legislative history
- Introduced in the House as the "INVEST in America Act" (H.R. 3684) by Peter DeFazio (D–OR) on June 4, 2021; Committee consideration by House Transportation and Infrastructure; Passed the House on July 1, 2021 (221–201); Passed the Senate as the "Infrastructure Investment and Jobs Act" on August 10, 2021 (69–30) with amendment; House agreed to Senate amendment on November 5, 2021 (228–206); Signed into law by President Joe Biden on November 15, 2021

The Infrastructure Investment and Jobs Act (IIJA), also known as the Bipartisan Infrastructure Law (BIL), (H.R. 3684) is a United States federal statute enacted by the 117th United States Congress and signed into law by President Joe Biden on November 15, 2021. It was introduced in the House as the INVEST in America Act and nicknamed the Bipartisan Infrastructure Bill. The act was initially a $547–715 billion infrastructure package that included provisions related to federal highway aid, transit, highway safety, motor carrier, research, hazardous materials and rail programs of the Department of Transportation. After congressional negotiations, it was amended and renamed the Infrastructure Investment and Jobs Act to add funding for broadband access, clean water and electric grid renewal in addition to the transportation and road proposals of the original House bill. This amended version included approximately $1.2 trillion in spending, with $550 billion in spending authorized for "new" programs or investments, on top of $650 billion authorized by Congress for work on existing infrastructure.

The amended bill was passed 69–30 by the Senate on August 10, 2021. On November 5, it was passed 228–206 by the House, and ten days later was signed into law by President Biden.

== Background ==
On March 31, 2021, President Joe Biden unveiled his $2.3 trillion American Jobs Plan (which, when combined with the American Families Plan, amounted to $4 trillion in infrastructure spending), pitched by him as "a transformative effort to overhaul the nation's economy". The detailed plan aimed to create millions of jobs, bolster labor unions, expand labor protections, and address climate change.

== Legislative history ==
=== Senate passage ===
In mid-April 2021, Republican lawmakers offered a $568 billion counterproposal to the American Jobs Plan. On May 9, Senate Minority Leader Mitch McConnell said it should cost no more than $800 billion. On May 21, the administration reduced the price tag to $1.7 trillion, which was quickly rejected by Republicans. A day later, a bipartisan group within the Senate Environment and Public Works Committee announced that they had reached a deal for $304 billion in U.S. highway funding. This was approved unanimously by the committee on May 26. On June 4, House Transportation and Infrastructure Committee Chair Peter DeFazio announced a $547 billion plan, called the INVEST in America Act, which would address parts of the American Jobs Plan. (Note: According to CBS News, this "would dedicate: $343 billion to roads, bridges and safety; $109 billion to public transit systems; and; $95 billion to passenger and freight rail.") On July 1, the House passed an amended $715 billion infrastructure bill focused on land transportation and water.

On May 27, Senator Shelley Moore Capito of West Virginia presented a $928 billion plan, (Note: The week before, a spokeswoman for Capito had said Republicans seemed to be "further apart" from Democrats regarding the bill than they were at their previous meeting with the president.) (Note: According to CNBC, the plan "includes: $506 billion for roads, bridges and major infrastructure projects; including $4 billion for electric vehicles; $72 billion for water systems; $65 billion for broadband; $56 billion for airports; $46 billion for passenger and freight rail systems; $22 billion for ports and waterways; $22 billion for water storage; $21 billion for safety efforts [and]; $20 billion for infrastructure financing".) and on June 4, increased it by about $50 billion; this was quickly rejected by the Biden administration. On June 8, the administration shifted its focus to a bipartisan group of 20 senators, which had been working on a package tentatively priced around $900 billion. (Note: On June 9, the House's 58-member bipartisan Problem Solvers Caucus presented a plan which would cost $1.25 trillion over eight years. According to The Hill, the plan "calls for: more than $959 billion for traditional infrastructure, including highways, bridges, rail, airports and waterways; [including] $25 billion ... for electric vehicle infrastructure, including electric buses ...; $74 billion for drinking water and wastewater systems; $71 billion for the electric grid and clean-energy programs; $45 billion for broadband; and; $10 billion for veterans' housing.") On June 10, a bipartisan group of 10 senators reached a deal costing $974 billion over five years; or about $1.2 trillion if stretched over eight years. On June 16, the plan was endorsed by a bipartisan group of 21 senators. On June 24, the bipartisan group met with the president and reached a compromise deal costing $1.2 trillion over eight years, which focuses on physical infrastructure (notably roads, bridges, railways, water, sewage, broadband, electric vehicles). This was planned to be paid for through reinforced Internal Revenue Service (IRS) collection, unspent COVID-19 relief funds, and other sources. By July 2021, the IRS portion of the funding had reportedly been scrapped. Biden stipulated that a separate "human infrastructure" bill (notably child care, home care, and climate change) – later known as the Build Back Better Act – must also pass, whether through bipartisanship or reconciliation, but later walked back this position. House Speaker Nancy Pelosi similarly stated that the House would not vote on the physical infrastructure bill until the larger bill passes in the Senate, despite the fact that reconciliation overrides much of the obstructive power of the filibuster.

White House officials stated on July 7 that legislative text was nearing completion. On July 14, the Senate Energy and Natural Resources Committee advanced an energy bill expected to be included in the bipartisan package. On July 21, Senate Majority Leader Charles Schumer put forward a "shell bill" for a vote to kick off debate in the Senate, intending to add the bipartisan text via an amendment. (Note: McConnell and some other Republicans indicated that they wished to see the text prior to voting on debating it. The measure initially failed to pass along party lines, with Schumer switching his vote to 'no' so he could recall the vote on another day.) On July 25, Senator Rob Portman of Ohio stated that an agreement was "about 90%" complete, with mass transit being one remaining point of contention. On July 30, Portman stated that this had been resolved. On July 28, Senator Kyrsten Sinema of Arizona stated that she did not support a reconciliation bill costing $3.5 trillion, breaking the stalemate and allowing the bipartisan bill to move forward. That day, the Senate voted 67–32 to advance the bill, and on July 30, voted 66–28 to proceed to its consideration. The legislation text was completed and substituted into the bill on August 1. On August 5, Schumer moved to truncate debate on the legislation, setting up a procedural vote on August 7, which passed 67–27. Fifteen or more amendments were expected to receive votes through the weekend. On August 10, the bill was passed by the Senate 69–30. It sets aside $550 billion in new spending. A procedural vote on a House rule concerning passing both bills passed along party lines on August 24.

=== House passage ===
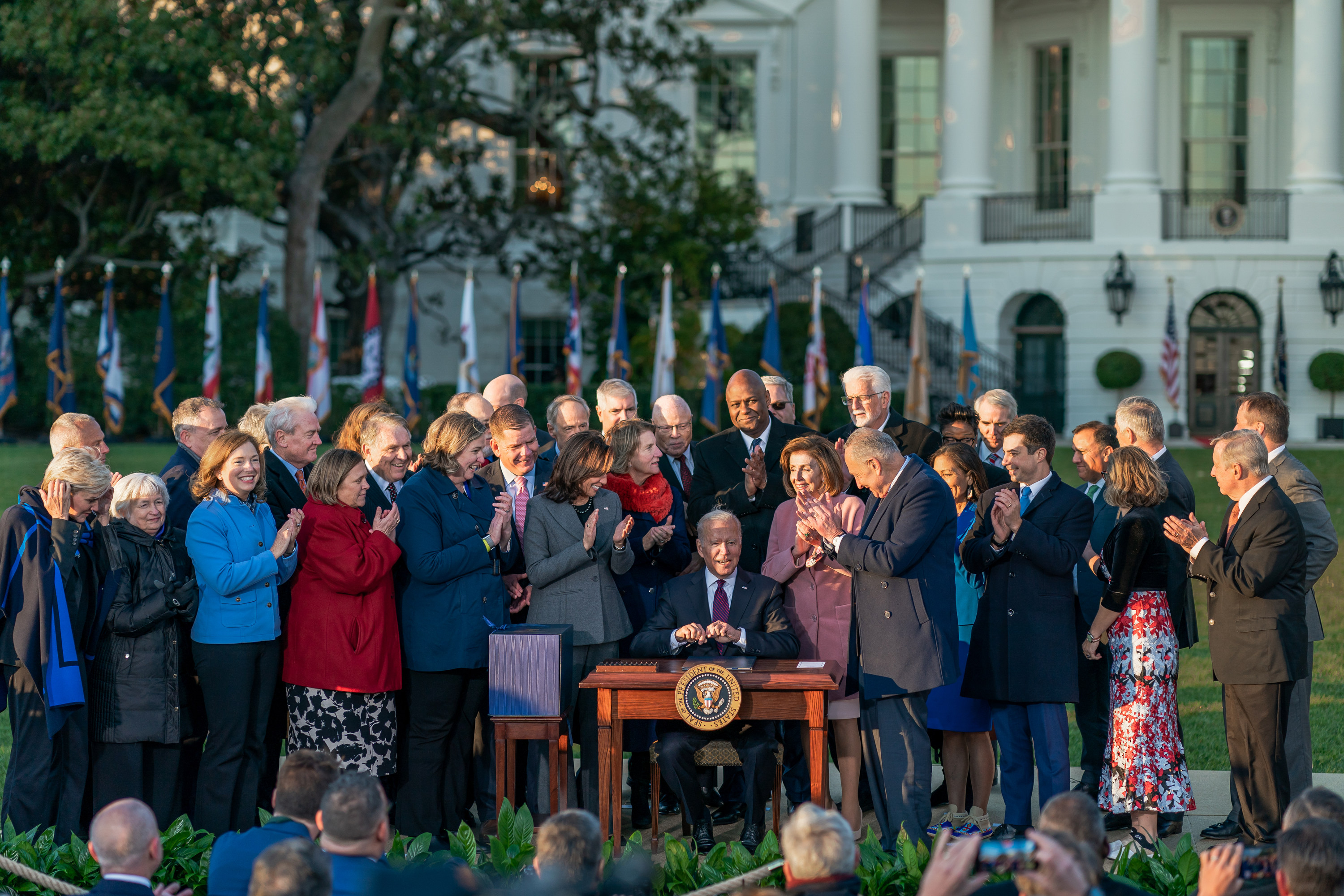
President Biden signing the Infrastructure Investment and Jobs Act into law on November 15, 2021

House vote by congressional district November 5 Democratic yea (215) Republican yea (13) Democratic nay (6) Republican nay (200)

In early August, nine moderate Democrats called for an immediate House vote on the bill, citing a desire not to lose the momentum from the Senate passage of the bill. They committed to voting against taking up the reconciliation resolution until there was a vote on the bipartisan infrastructure bill. While both Biden and House Speaker Nancy Pelosi had reversed earlier positions to support passing the bipartisan bill separately, progressives including Congressional Progressive Caucus chairwoman Pramila Jayapal and Senator Bernie Sanders maintained that it be utilized as leverage to pass the most expensive reconciliation bill possible. The lack of a deal caused a late September House vote to be postponed. On October 2, Pelosi set a new deadline of October 31. By October 28, Jayapal and other progressive leaders indicated that they were willing to vote on the bill separately, but Sanders and others opposed this. On October 31, a majority of progressives signaled that they would support both bills.

Votes on both bills were considered on November 5, but the hesitation of several moderates to pass the reconciliation bill before it could be scored by the Congressional Budget Office made passing the bipartisan bill unlikely. Negotiations between centrist and progressive Democrats concluded with the centrists committing to passing the Build Back Better Act. The bill ultimately went to a vote, as did a rule to vote on the larger bill once it was scored, passing 228–206; 13 Republicans joined all but six Democrats (members of "the Squad") in supporting the legislation. The six Democrats who voted 'No' stated that their opposition was because the legislation had been decoupled from the social-safety net provisions of the Build Back Better bill. Biden signed the bill into law at a signing ceremony on November 15.

== Original version of the IIJA ==
The following is the bill summary authorized by the Congressional Research Service (CRS) for the INVEST in America Act, the original version which passed the House on July 1, 2021:

- "extends FY2021 enacted levels through FY2022 for federal-aid highway, transit, and safety programs;
- reauthorizes for FY2023-FY2026 several surface transportation programs, including the federal-aid highway program, transit programs, highway safety, motor carrier safety, and rail programs;
- addresses climate change, including strategies to reduce the climate change impacts of the surface transportation system and a vulnerability assessment to identify opportunities to enhance the resilience of the surface transportation system and ensure the efficient use of federal resources;
- revises the Buy America Act procurement requirements for highways, mass transit, and rail;
- establishes a rural bridge rebuilding program to improve the safety and state of good repair of bridges in rural communities;
- implements new safety requirements across all transportation modes; and
- directs the Department of Transportation to establish a pilot program to demonstrate a national motor vehicle per-mile user fee to restore and maintain the long-term solvency of the Highway Trust Fund and achieve and maintain a state of good repair in the surface transportation system."

The specific amounts in surface transportation spending were $343 billion for roads, highways, bridges and motor safety, $109 billion for transit, and $95 billion for rail. Provisions of the bill incentivized prioritizing maintenance and repair spending over spending on new infrastructure, holistically planning for all modes of transport when considering how to connect job centers to housing (including collecting data on reductions in vehicle miles traveled through transit-oriented development), mandating that internet service providers and transportation agencies coordinate road maintenance and fiber-optic cable laying, and lowering speed limits to increase road safety and encourage building complete streets. The Senate version, and the final bill, de-emphasized these incentives.

== Provisions ==
=== Overview ===
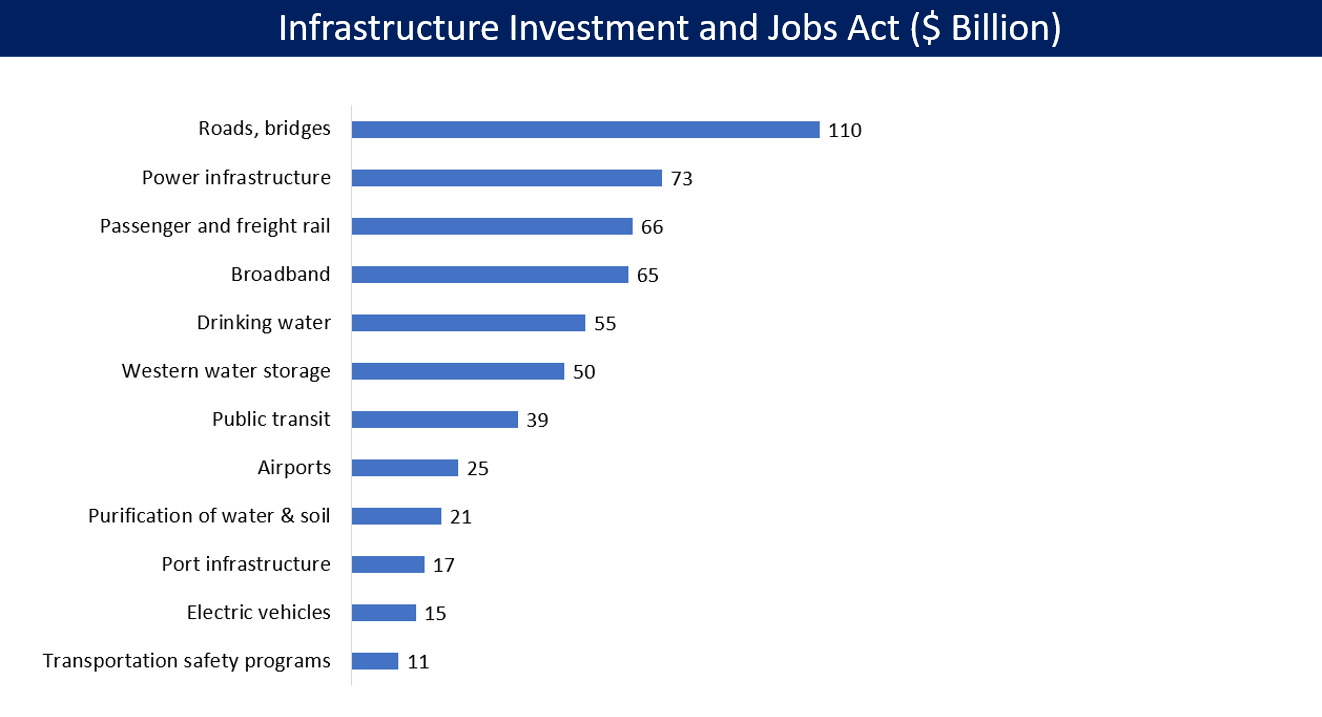
Investment categories ($ billion) in the Infrastructure Investment and Jobs Act of 2021, adding to about $550 billion over a decade

According to NPR, the version which passed the Senate on July 28 included:

- $110 billion for roads, bridges and other major projects;
- $11 billion for transportation safety programs;
- $39 billion to modernize transit and improve accessibility;
- $66 billion for passenger and freight rail;
- $7.5 billion to build a national network of electric vehicle chargers;
- $73 billion to overhaul the nation's power infrastructure, including the design, engineering and construction of new energy transmission systems as well as modernization of old ones;
- $65 billion for broadband development.

The law makes the Minority Business Development Agency a permanent agency. It authorizes the DOT to create an organization called the Advanced Research Projects Agency–Infrastructure (ARPA–I), with a broad remit over transportation research akin to agencies such as DARPA and ARPA-E, with the first appropriations of $3.22 million being made in the Consolidated Appropriations Act, 2023. It broadens the powers of the Federal Permitting Improvement Steering Council and codifies the Trump administration's One Federal Decision executive order to provide faster conflict resolution among agencies, in speeding up infrastructure design approvals.

=== Impact on environment and climate ===
An October 2021 report written by the REPEAT Project, a partnership between the Evolved Energy Research firm and Princeton University's ZERO Lab, said the Infrastructure Investment and Jobs Act alone will make only a small reduction in emissions, but as they say:

We lack modeling capabilities to reflect the net effect of surface transportation investments in highways (which tend to increase on-road vehicle and freight miles traveled) and rail and public transit (which tend to reduce on-road vehicle and freight miles traveled). These significant programs are therefore not modeled in this analysis, an important limitation of our assessment of the Infrastructure Investment and Jobs Act.

The Georgetown Climate Center tried to estimate how the $599 billion investment for surface transportation in the law can impact emissions from transportation. It created two scenarios: "high emissions" and "low emissions". In the first scenario, from the money dedicated to highways, more money will go to building new highways, while in the second, more will go to repairing existing highways. The other spending areas' characteristics are not so different. The first scenario sees increased cumulative emissions over the years 2022–2040 by more than 200 million tons, while the second decreases them by around 250 million tons.

In August 2022, the Boston Consulting Group analyzed the Act and found $41 billion of it would be spent on energy projects germane to climate action, $18 billion on similarly germane transportation projects, $18 billion on "clean tech" intended to cut hard-to-abate emissions, $0 on manufacturing, and $34 billion on other climate action provisions.

A January 2022 White House fact sheet states that the law includes the largest federal investment in public transit in history. The law includes spending figures of $105 billion in public transport. It also spends $110 billion on fixing roads and bridges and includes measures for climate change mitigation and improving access for cyclists and pedestrians. Increasing use of public transport and related transit-oriented development can reduce transportation emissions in human settlements by 78% and overall US emissions by 15%.

The law includes spending:

- $21 billion for environmental projects
- $50 billion for water storage
- $15 billion for electric vehicles
- $73 billion to overhaul the energy policy of the United States
- $4.7 billion to cap orphan wells abandoned by oil and gas companies
- $1 billion to better connect neighborhoods separated by transport infrastructure as part of environmental justice efforts. This $1 billion will be spent through the Reconnecting Communities Pilot (RCP) discretionary grant program that, among other priorities, promotes:

New or improved, affordable transportation options to increase safe mobility and connectivity for all, including for people with disabilities, through lower-carbon travel like walking, cycling, rolling, and transit that reduce greenhouse gas emissions and promote active travel.

The final version of the IIJA restores the Superfund excise tax on certain chemicals which expired in 1995.

=== Energy ===
$73 billion will be spent on overhauling the energy infrastructure of the United States. The Boston Consulting Group projects $41 billion of the Act will be related to climate action in energy. $11 billion of the $73 billion amount will be invested in the electrical grid's adjustment to renewable energy, with some of the money going to new loans for electric power transmission lines and required studies for future transmission needs. $6 billion of that $73 billion will go to domestic nuclear power. Also of that $73 billion, the IIJA invests $45 billion in innovation and industrial policy for key emerging technologies in energy; $430 million–$21 billion in new demonstration projects at the DOE; and nearly $24 billion in onshoring, supply chain resilience, and bolstering U.S.-held competitive advantages in energy; the latter amount will be divided into an $8.6 billion investment in carbon capture and storage, $3 billion in battery material reprocessing, $3 billion in battery recycling, $1 billion in rare-earth minerals stockpiling, and $8 billion in new research hubs for green hydrogen. The DOE has imposed grant requirements on $7 billion of the IIJA's battery and transportation spending, which are meant to promote community benefits agreements, social justice, and formation of trade unions. The IIJA superseded the federal court decision California Wildlife Coalition v. U.S. Department of Energy, thus restoring some of FERC's authority to designate a type of high-demand power corridor under Section 216 of the Energy Policy Act of 2005. It created the $225 million Resilient and Efficient Codes Implementation program for cities, tribes and counties to revise building codes for electrical and heating work. Finally, the law gives $4.7 billion to cap orphan wells abandoned by oil and gas companies.

=== Broadband ===
The law invests a total of $65 billion in advancing the U.S. quest for broadband universal service. Of this $65 billion, the law invests $42.45 billion in a new infrastructure grant program by the National Telecommunications and Information Administration called the Broadband Equity, Access, and Deployment Program (BEAD), with highest priority going to communities with Internet speeds below 25 downstream and 3 upstream mbps. $2 billion will go to the NTIA's Tribal Broadband Connectivity Program, $1 billion to a new middle mile infrastructure program, $1.44 billion in formula grants to state and territorial digital equity plan implementation, $60 million in formula grants to new digital equity plan development, and $1.25 billion in discretionary grants to "specific types of political subdivisions to implement digital equity projects". The law gives the USDA $5.5 billion of the $65 billion total to deliver broadband to rural communities smaller than 20,000 people, $5 million of which is obligated to utility cooperatives.

The law invests $14.2 billion of the total in the Federal Communications Commission's Affordable Connectivity Program, the successor to the American Rescue Plan's broadband subsidies. It gives a $30 monthly discount on internet services to qualifying low-income families ($75 on tribal lands), and provides a $100 discount on tablets, laptops and desktops for them. The law also requires the FCC to return consumer broadband labels it developed in 2016 to statute, to revise its public comment process, and to issue rules and model policies for combating digital deployment discrimination, with the United States attorney general's cooperation. The Government Accountability Office was to deliver a report on updating broadband thresholds by November 2022.

=== Water ===
To support safe drinking water programs, the law provides:

- $11.7 billion for the Drinking Water State Revolving Fund (SRF)
- $15 billion to local water systems for lead service line replacement
- $9 billion to address emerging contaminants such as PFAS ($4 billion through the SRF and $5 billion through grants to water utilities)
- $3.5 billion to build water and sewer systems for the Indian Health Service.

For surface water programs, such as watershed management and pollution control, the law provides:

- $12.7 billion for the Clean Water State Revolving Fund to support state and local government water quality programs
- $1.7 billion for geographic-based programs including the National Estuary Program, the Great Lakes program and the Chesapeake Bay Program.

==== Addressing drought in Western states ====
The Act provides $8 billion for helping Western states deal with the Southwestern North American megadrought. Spending for many related projects is included under the category "Western Water Infrastructure".

=== Bridges ===
Prior to the enactment of the infrastructure law in 2021, no dedicated federal bridge funding had existed since fiscal year 2013. The law created two new programs specifically to fund bridge projects:

==== Bridge Formula Program (BFP) ====
With $27.5 billion over five years, the BFP distributes funds to every state, the District of Columbia, and Puerto Rico based on a formula that accounts for each state's cost to replace or rehabilitate its poor or fair condition bridges. Each state is guaranteed a minimum of $45 million per year from this program. At least 15% of each state's funds must be spent on off-system bridges (i.e., public bridges that are not on federal-aid highways), and 3% is set aside each year for bridges on tribal lands. Off-system and tribal bridge projects may be funded with a 100% federal share (as opposed to the standard 80% federal share).

==== Bridge Investment Program (BIP) ====
With $12.5 billion over five years, the BIP is a competitive grant program to replace, rehabilitate, preserve, or make resiliency improvements to bridges. Half of the funding is reserved for large bridge projects, which are defined as projects that cost over $100 million. Large projects are funded at a maximum 50% federal share, while other projects are funded at a maximum 80% federal share.

=== Passenger rail ===
The infrastructure law is the largest investment in passenger rail since the 1971 creation of Amtrak (which under the law will receive $22 billion in advance appropriations and $19 billion in fully authorized funds). It directly appropriated $66 billion for rail over a five-year period (including the Amtrak appropriations), of which at least $18 billion is designated for expanding passenger rail service to new corridors, and it authorized an additional $36 billion. Most of this funding for new passenger rail lines is implemented through the Federal-State Partnership for Intercity Passenger Rail program, which will receive $36 billion in advance appropriations and $7.5 billion in fully authorized funds. The Consolidated Rail Infrastructure and Safety Improvements program will receive $5 billion in advance appropriations and $5 billion in fully authorized funds, while programs for grade separation replacing level crossings will receive $3 billion in advance appropriations and $2.5 billion in fully authorized funds, and the Restoration and Enhancement Grant program intended to revive discontinued passenger rail services will receive $250 million in advance appropriations and $250 million in fully authorized funds. Per the law's requirements, at least $12 billion is available and $3.4–4.1 billion authorized for expanding service outside of the Northeast Corridor, and $24 billion is available and $3.4–4.1 billion authorized to partially rebuild the Corridor.

To help plan and guide the expansion of passenger rail service beyond the Northeast Corridor, the infrastructure law also created a $1.8 billion Corridor Identification and Development Program. The law also expands eligibility for a potential $23 billion in transit funding to these corridors and changes the allocation methods for state government-supported passenger rail shorter than 750 miles, to encourage states to implement more such service.

=== Transit station accessibility ===
The law established and authorized $1.75 billion over five years for a new All Stations Accessibility Program (ASAP). This program is designed to improve the accessibility of rail system stations that were built before the Americans with Disabilities Act of 1990 (ADA). At the time of the infrastructure law's passage, over 900 transit stations were not fully ADA-compliant.

=== Highway removal and complete streets ===
The law includes $1 billion over five years for Reconnecting Communities planning and construction grants intended to build marginalized community-recommended projects removing or capping highways and railroads, the first $185 million of which were awarded to 45 projects on February 28, 2023. The program was later combined with the Neighborhood Equity and Access program from the Inflation Reduction Act for efficiency reasons, before the next 132 projects were given $3.3 billion in awards on March 13, 2024.

=== Charging stations ===
The Infrastructure Investment and Jobs Act established the National Electric Vehicle Infrastructure (NEVI) Formula Program, allocating $5 billion over fiscal years 2022 through 2026 for electric vehicle (EV) charging infrastructure. The Federal Highway Administration (FHWA), part of the Department of Transportation, administers the program and provides funding to states for up to 80 percent of eligible project costs. The program initially focused on installing charging infrastructure along designated Alternative Fuel Corridors.

Implementation of the program was slow during the first several years. By early 2024, four states had opened a total of seven federally funded charging stations nationwide. At a June 2024 Senate hearing, Democratic Senator Jeff Merkley described the slow rollout of NEVI-funded charging stations as "a vast administrative failure". By the end of the Biden administration in January 2025, a total of 25 NEVI-funded charging locations had opened. By January 2026, states had requested reimbursement for approximately $94 million of the $4.4 billion made available to them under NEVI. States had also obligated approximately $1.4 billion in funding.

=== Vehicle safety ===
The Infrastructure Investment and Jobs Act requires the National Highway Traffic Safety Administration (NHTSA) to develop a safety mechanism to prevent drunk driving, which causes about 10,000 deaths each year in the United States as of 2021, which will be rolled out in phases for retroactive fitting, and will become mandatory for all new vehicles in 2027. The technology, which is being developed by NHTSA in cooperation with the Automotive Coalition for Traffic Safety and Swedish automobile safety company Autoliv, consists of a breath-based and a touch-based sensor that stops the car if the driver is above the legal blood alcohol content, and will be open-licensed to automobile manufacturers.

Under the law, the United States Department of Transportation (DOT) will be required to develop regulations for a system that can detect distracted, fatigued, or impaired drivers. The NHTSA has recommended implementing a camera-based warning system for the former, similar to a technology mandated by the European Union in July 2022.

The law also requires the NHTSA's New Car Assessment Program to test collision avoidance systems in preparation for new federal regulations; new DOT reporting requirements for statistical data on crashes involving e-scooters and electric bicycles; new federal regulations on headlamps; research directives on technology to protect pedestrians and cyclists, advanced driver-assistance systems, federal hood and bumper regulations, smart city infrastructure, and self-driving cars; and a new Federal Highway Administration (FHWA) office specializing in cybersecurity.

=== Wildlife crossings and conservation ===
The infrastructure law created the Wildlife Crossings Pilot Program with $350 million in funding over five years. This is a competitive grant program that funds planning and construction projects that prevent wildlife-vehicle collisions and improve the connectivity of animal habitats.

The law also allocated $1 billion to create the National Culvert Removal, Replacement, and Restoration Grant program to improve the passage of anadromous fish such as salmon.

== Implementation and results ==
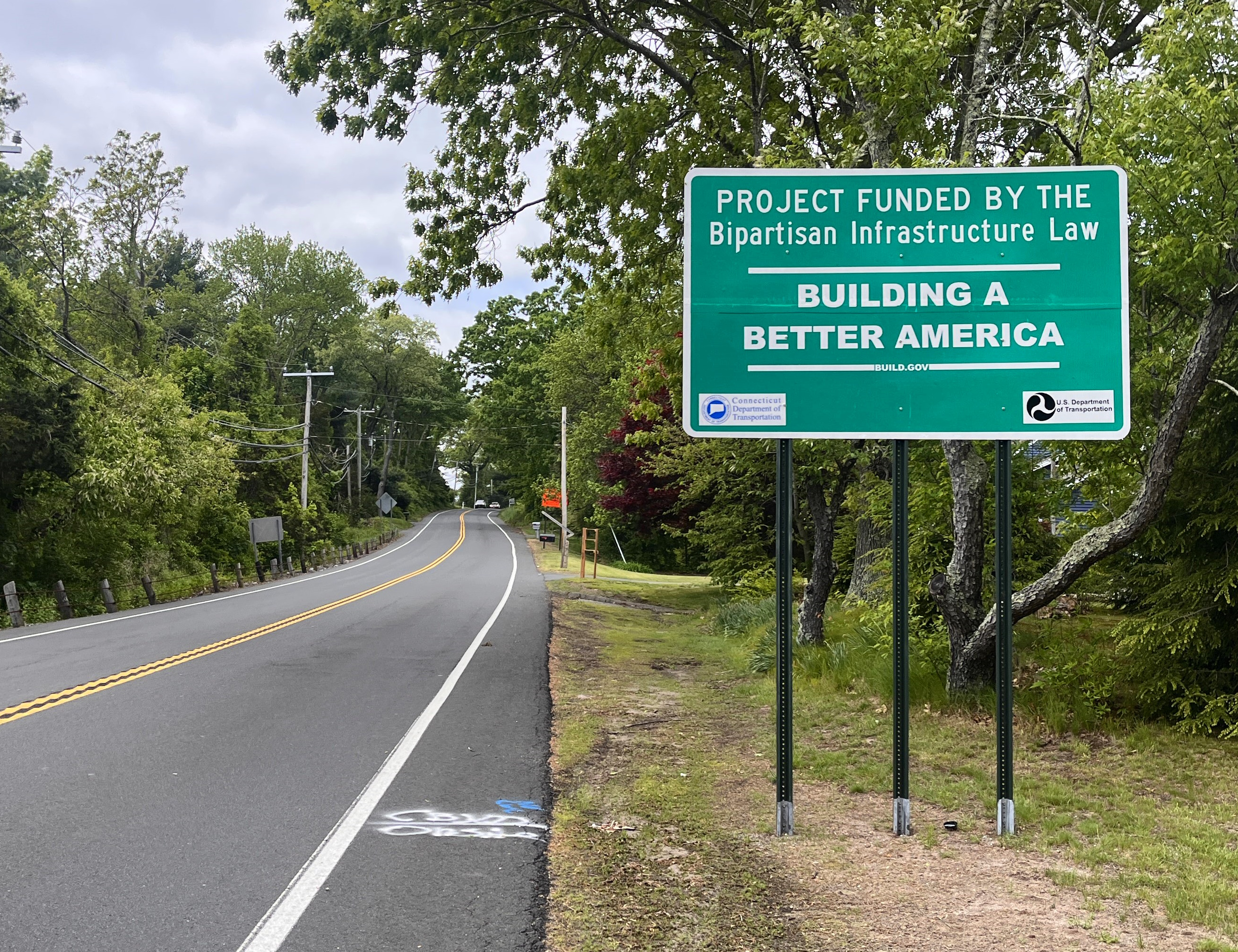
A sign for a road project funded by the Infrastructure Investment and Jobs Act in Avon, Connecticut

Biden's infrastructure advisor and the staffer in charge of implementing the law has been identified as Mitch Landrieu. Biden's National Security Advisor Jake Sullivan has been identified as the staffer in charge of ensuring the law does not conflict with American foreign policy interests. To support the implementation of the Act, Biden issued Executive Order 14052, which establishes a task force comprising most of his Cabinet. Biden appointed Landrieu and then-United States National Economic Council chief Brian Deese as the task force co-chairs.

In May 2022, the Biden administration published a manual on the use of the law, aimed mainly at local authorities. The manual briefly describes the over 350 programs included in the law. Each description includes the aim of the program, its funding and possible recipients, its period of availability, and more. The programs are grouped into four categories: "Transportation", "Climate, Energy and the Environment", "Broadband", and "Other Programs".

By the law's second anniversary in November 2023, around $400 billion from the law, about a third of all IIJA funding, was allocated to more than 40,000 projects related to infrastructure, transport, and sustainability. By May 2024, the law's halfway mark, the numbers had increased to $454 billion (38 percent of the Act's funds) for more than 56,000 projects, and by the third anniversary in November 2024, they had increased to $568 billion (47 percent) to 68,000 projects, leaving 53 percent of IIJA funds unallocated but showing the administration had been accelerating funding approvals. Public attention has remained relatively low, due in part to slow implementation of projects.

The White House offers a "Map of Progress" which tracks all spending that resulted from the act.

=== Macroeconomic impact ===
According to the New Democrat-linked think tank Center for American Progress, the IIJA, the CHIPS and Science Act, and the Inflation Reduction Act have together catalyzed over 35,000 public and private investments. Economists Noah Smith and Joseph Politano credited the three acts together for spurring booms in factory construction and utility jobs, as well as limiting geographic concentrations of key industries to ensure more dispersed job creation nationwide, though they raised issues of whether the three would serve to limit project delays and significantly increase labor productivity in the long term. The Biden administration itself claimed that as of January 10, 2025, the IIJA, CaSA, and IRA together catalyzed $1 trillion in private investment (including $449 billion in electronics and semiconductors, $184 billion in electric vehicles and batteries, $215 billion in clean power, $93 billion in clean energy tech manufacturing and infrastructure, and $51 billion in heavy industry) and over $756.2 billion in public infrastructure spending (including $99 billion in energy aside from tax credits in the IRA).

=== Energy and industry ===
In September 2023, White House data revealed that 60 percent of the Act's energy and transmission funding (up to that point, totaling $12.31 billion) had been awarded to states that voted majority Republican in the 2020 election cycle. Of the Act's top ten recipients, seven states had voted majority Republican, with Wyoming ($1.95 billion) and Texas ($1.71 billion) in the lead. The largest single energy project to receive Act funds was a Generation IV reactor in Kemmerer, Wyoming by the nuclear fission startup TerraPower.

In November 2022, the Biden administration announced it would furnish $550 million for the Energy Efficiency and Conservation Block Grant program for clean energy generators for low-income and minority communities, the first such appropriation since the Recovery Act in 2009. The administration announced the competitive portion would award $8.8 million to 12 communities on October 12, 2023, with the next award applications due in April (later changed to October) 2024. By June 28, 2024, the seventh tranche of funding had been awarded from the EECBG program, totaling about $150 million for 175 communities, with that date's instance seeing $18.5 million awarded to four states and 20 communities.

In April 2023, the Biden administration announced it would award $450 million from the Act to projects that built solar farms on abandoned coal mines. Further support for coal communities followed. In November 2023 the IIJA's Office of Manufacturing and Energy Supply Chains announced $275 million in grants would go to seven projects in coal communities, creating 1,500 jobs and leveraging $600 million in private investment. The next October it announced $428 million in grants for 14 projects in coal communities, creating 1,900 jobs and leveraging $500 million in private investments.

On July 12, 2023, the Biden administration announced it would award $90 million from the Act's Resilient and Efficient Codes Implementation program to 27 cities and counties to update building energy codes. On March 4, 2024 the DOE announced $90 million more would be awarded from the program later that October.

On October 24, 2023, the administration announced the first $3.46 billion in Grid Resilience and Innovation Partnerships grants from the Act's $11 billion grid rebuilding authorization, would go to 58 projects in 44 states. A majority are categorized for smart grid projects and eight are categorized as pursuing grid innovation. The investment is the largest in the American grid since the Recovery Act 14 years earlier. According to Energy Secretary Jennifer Granholm, the projects could enable 35 gigawatts of renewable energy to come online by 2030, $8 billion in investments to be catalyzed, and 400 microgrids to be built. On August 6, 2024, the DOE announced the recipients of the next $2.2 billion in GRIP grants, eight grid innovation projects across 18 states adding a total of 13 gigawatts of capacity to the grid and catalyzing $10 billion in investments. On October 18, 2024, the DOE announced nearly $2 billion more in GRIP grants would be awarded to 38 smaller projects in 42 states and the District of Columbia, altogether adding 7.5 gigawatts of capacity to the grid and catalyzing nearly $4.2 billion in investment.

On October 30, 2023, the DOE announced the results of a mandated triennial study that, for the first time in its history, included anticipation of future grid transmission needs; the Act had explicitly required this inclusion. The study found fewer infrastructure investments since 2015 and consistently high prices in the Rust Belt and California since 2018, and projected a 20 to 128 percent increase in transmission would be needed within regions, while interregional transmission would need to increase by 25 to 412 percent. The DOE found the most potential was in better connecting Texas to the Southwest region, the Mississippi Delta and Midwest regions to the Great Plains region, and New York to New England. The DOE also announced the first three recipients of a new $2.5 billion loan program called the Transmission Facilitation Program, created to provide funding to help build up the interstate power grid. They are a line between Quebec, New Hampshire and Vermont, a line between Utah and Nevada; and a line between Arizona and New Mexico. The following April 25, the TFP announced the selection of an extension of the One Nevada Transmission Line northward to Idaho. The next October, the DOE announced that four projects in Maine, Oklahoma, New Mexico, and between Texas and Mississippi, were being awarded a total of $1.5 billion under the TFP; the DOE also released its first ever National Transmission Planning Study to follow up on the Needs Study, forecasting a needed national transmission capacity increase of 2.4 to 3.5 times the 2020 level by 2050 to keep costs low and facilitate the energy transmission, with estimated cost savings ranging from $270 billion to $490 billion.

On November 16, 2023, the Biden administration announced the first recipients of $40.8 million in grants from a workforce training program the Act created, which will provide skills for industrial technology, the building trades and energy auditing. In December 2023 the DOE fulfilled the IIJA's requirement that the designation process for National Interest Electric Transmission Corridors be revised.

On January 17, 2024, more than $104 million were allocated to 31 projects which are expected to increase energy conservation and clean energy use in federal facilities and save $29 million in their first years. The projects advance, among other technologies, heat recovery ventilation, heat pumps, building insulation, and solar thermal panels. On February 13, the Biden administration announced that Chevron Corporation and Fervo Energy would receive $74 million under the law to begin demonstrating the efficacy of enhanced geothermal systems, at a site near The Geysers, California for Chevron, and a site near Milford, Utah for Fervo. On February 27, the Department of Energy announced that under the Energy Improvements in Rural or Remote Areas program, 17 projects in rural areas across 20 states and 30 tribal communities had been approved to receive $366 million in grants to decarbonize and densify their grids. A majority of approved projects involved installation of solar panels, grid battery storage, and microgrids.

On March 21, the Biden administration announced that five projects in Arizona, Nevada, West Virginia, Kentucky, and Pennsylvania would receive $475 million from the Act, to build solar and geothermal power plants and energy storage on current and former mine lands. On March 25, 2024, the Biden administration announced the first 33 grant recipients of the Department of Energy's $6 billion Industrial Demonstrations Program to reduce embedded emissions in factories and materials processing, of which the Infrastructure Investment and Jobs Act funds $489 million. Cement and concrete industry projects received $1.5 billion in total, steelmaking projects received $1.5 billion, and chemical engineering and refinery projects $1.2 billion. The Biden administration expects these projected to drive 1.4 million tons in carbon emissions cuts; however, most of the grants had yet to be finalized by November 11. On April 30, the Department of Energy announced 19 more recipients across 12 states and 13 tribal communities, of $78 million in award grants from the Act's Energy Improvements in Remote or Rural Areas program, with a majority of projects involving solar power.

On May 13, 2024, the Federal Energy Regulatory Commission published Order No. 1977, clarifying a provision in the Act by stating that the Commission has 'backstop siting authority' in case a state agency neglects to hand out a construction permit for a new transmission project.

On September 5, 2024, the Energy Department announced the awarding of over $430 million in incentives to 293 existing hydroelectricity projects, under the Act's Section 40333. On September 20, the DOE announced it would award $3 billion to, and leverage $13 billion in investments in, 25 battery manufacturing and supply chain projects, more than half of which had pledged Project Labor Agreements. 12,000 new jobs across 14 states were projected for creation.

In December 2024, the DOE announced that the first three new NIETCs under the IIJA's process would move closer toward full eligibility for TFP funds under the Act's new process, a corridor on the bed of Lake Erie between Ontario and Pennsylvania, a connector between Colorado, New Mexico and Oklahoma, and a connector between the Dakotas. Notably, the sponsor of the Kansas-Indiana Grain Belt Express requested that it be taken off the eligibility list because they had likely secured enough funding to do so. However, the Trump administration would later cancel these three corridors in August 2026, citing grid reliability concerns while calling them part of the "Green New Scam".

=== Hydrogen hubs ===
The Biden administration awarded $7 billion of the $8 billion appropriation to seven hydrogen research hubs, based in California, eastern Washington, southeastern Pennsylvania, southeastern Texas, Illinois, Minnesota, and West Virginia and affecting projects there and in eight more states, on October 13, 2023. The remaining $1 billion will be used for demand-side economic policies to drive growth in hydrogen use.

Several criticisms of the hubs emerged. Jeff St. John, editor in chief of Canary Media, noted while it does mandate that the DOE create a clean hydrogen definitional standard (which as of October 2023 the DOE had not published), and that the DOE selected applicants who pledged community benefits agreements, the Act does not prescribe metrics or guidelines for measuring emissions from these hubs. Researcher Hannah Story Brown of the watchdog group Revolving Door Project noted that the majority of hub projects announced are powered by fossil fuels, not renewable energy. Staffers for California Governor Gavin Newsom requested that the Treasury Department exempt the state's hub from emissions restrictions, citing poor alignment with the state's plans for 100% renewable energy.

On the first anniversary of the October 2023 announcement, St. John reported that the hub collaboratives in California, Washington, and West Virginia were the farthest along in working towards finalizing their funding, and the DOE's Office of Clean Energy Demonstrations was optimistic, but also that all projects were lagging behind in transparency and community outreach, with several projects seeing corporate partners withdraw. Jael Holzman of the outlet Heatmap News reported that soon after, experts in energy markets pointed at a lack of coordination between the Hub program and the IRA's hydrogen tax credits, price increases for electrolyzers, and the historically low cost of natural gas as additional reasons for the withdrawal of investment in Hub projects.

Later in 2024, the DOE selected the hubs based in California, Washington, Illinois, Texas and West Virginia for near-final deals that together would cost a total $5.3 billion. The final two hubs based in Minnesota and Pennsylvania were not far behind in negotiations.

=== Direct air capture hubs ===
The Act appropriates $3.5 billion to a new Regional Direct Air Capture Hubs program as part of its $8.6 billion carbon capture and storage investment. In August 2023, the DOE selected two projects (leaving two more to be selected), together worth $1.2 billion:

- The South Texas Hub in Kleberg County, Texas, run by Carbon Engineering, Occidental Petroleum and Worley Group.
- Project Cypress in Calcasieu Parish, Louisiana, run by Battelle Memorial Institute, Climeworks and Heirloom Carbon Technologies.

The projects together will remove 2 million metric tons of carbon dioxide and create 4,800 jobs.

In September 2024, the DOE announced it intended to fund up to $1.8 billion more in direct air capture projects, with the full solicitation released on December 17.

=== Broadband ===
By April 2024, the Affordable Connectivity Program had seen 23 million households enroll in it. As of June 2024, the program has ended.

=== Water ===
In May 2024, the Biden administration announced $3 billion in funding from the law had been allotted to replace lead water pipes.

=== Transportation ===
The bill contains $27 billion in funding for specific, concrete programs within the Federal Highway Administration that are already implemented to reduce greenhouse gas emissions from the transportation sector, all of which was allotted in November 2023. For example, $7.2 billion is allocated to the "Transportation Alternatives Set-Aside Program" (creating more possibilities for biking and walking), $6.4 billion to the "Carbon Reduction Program" (reducing emissions from highways), $69 million to the "Transit-Oriented Development Program" (enhancing transit-oriented development and improving land use) and more. However, because states have wide discretion over use of funds from other highway programs under the Act, which leads to states with fast population growth investing more in highway expansion, the Act has been projected by Transportation for America to increase carbon emissions by 77 million metric tonnes by 2040 compared to a no-Act baseline.

On December 4, the Department of Energy released a proposed rule clarifying the definition of "foreign entities of concern" under the Act's car battery materials provisions, in line with the Inflation Reduction Act's Section 30D.

On December 8, the Biden administration announced it would award $8.2 billion from the Act's Federal-State Partnership for Intercity Passenger Rail Program to ten construction projects, including Brightline West, the Southeast High Speed Rail Corridor, the Keystone Corridor, California High-Speed Rail, the Downeaster and Empire Builder services, a partial rebuilding of Chicago Union Station, and a bridge replacement near Willow on the Alaska Railroad. It also announced the first results of the Act's Corridor ID Program, with $34.5 million being distributed to 15 existing rail upgrades, 47 extensions of rail corridors, and 7 new high-speed rail studies.

The bill included $7.5 billion for electric vehicle charging. As of April 2025, 68 charging stations with a total of 384 spots for charging vehicles had been built.

On April 2, 2024, an award announcement was made for the transit-oriented development program, which was expanded under the Act.

In the 2026 edition of its pedestrian safety report Dangerous by Design, Transportation for America's program Smart Growth America stated the following:

[T]he historic investment made in the Infrastructure Investment and Jobs Act (IIJA) could have drastically changed streets across the country, redefining what a successful transportation system means in the twenty-first century. Instead, safety was once again siloed as the specific purpose of small programs, rather than the top priority of the entire program, and Congress doubled down on the same overall approach that has produced some of the worst roadway fatality rates in the developed world.

— Eric Cova, Jaibin Mathew, and Heidi Simon, "US vs. the world", from Dangerous by Design

=== Ecosystems ===
In 2023 an agreement between seven states was achieved, aiming to preserve the Colorado River water system from collapse due to poor management and climate change. The United States is heavily dependent on the river for power generation, drinking water, agriculture, wildlands restoration, and native cultural practices. Some states will reduce water use, receiving compensation for it (totaling $1.2 billion) from the federal government. Many other projects for preserving the river such as water recycling and rainwater harvesting, are advanced. The funding comes from the Infrastructure Investment and Jobs Act and the Inflation Reduction Act.

In February 2024, $157 million was allocated to 206 projects linked to ecosystem restoration. The projects are spread all over the territory of the United States and are advanced in cooperation with states, tribes, nonprofits and territories. More than half of them benefit underserved communities. The projects include cleaning up pollution, restoring Central U.S. grasslands including bison populations, protecting birds in Hawaii from extinction, stopping invasive species, restoring salmon populations in Alaska, restoring sagebrush steppes and more. On this occasion United States Secretary of the Interior Deb Haaland remarked, "Nature is our best ally in the fight against climate change."

=== Climate adaptation ===
The bill provides around $7 billion to the Federal Emergency Management Agency for helping communities adapt to different climate-related disasters such as hurricanes, droughts, and heat waves. In August 2023, $3 billion was allocated to different related projects, including 124 projects related to resilient infrastructure and communities (located in "38 states, one tribe and the District of Columbia") and 149 projects related to protection from flooding (located in "28 states and the District of Columbia"). From the projects related to infrastructure, 64 use nature-based solutions. Some of the most vulnerable communities will receive help for free.

In November 2023, the Biden administration announced that $300 million from FEMA's new Swift Current Initiative created by the Act would go to helping communities impacted by floods recover and grow their resiliency. It also announced that it would award "$50 million in project awards to improve the reliability of water resources and support ecosystem health in Western states, along with an additional $50 million funding opportunity for water conservation projects and hydropower upgrades."

In March 2024, $120 million was delivered to help indigenous peoples in the U.S. adapt to climate change. Of this number, $26 million was allocated from the Infrastructure Investment and Jobs Act. The efforts will include planning, ecosystem management and restoration, planned relocation, and promotion and use of indigenous knowledge.

=== By state ===
==== Florida ====
Around $1.1 billion was allocated for restoration of the Everglades ecosystems. In March 2024, Marco Rubio, supported by a bipartisan group of lawmakers, demanded $725 million more, as the rising levels of water in the Lake Okeechobee created additional problems.

==== Wisconsin ====
In October 2023, $450 million (including $275 million from the bill) was delivered to clean the Milwaukee River estuary of Polychlorinated biphenyl, heavy metals, and oil products. This pollution had negative effects on surrounding communities for a long time. This is the most funding ever distributed by a Great Lakes cleanup program.

== Reactions ==
=== Congress ===
Republican senators balked at Biden's tandem plan to pass both a bipartisan plan and a separate Democratic-supported reconciliation bill. McConnell criticized Biden for "caving" to his own party by issuing an "ultimatum" that he would not sign the bipartisan bill without a separate reconciliation package. After Biden walked back his comments, Republican senators restated their confidence in the bipartisan bill. A Yahoo! News/YouGov poll conducted in late June found that 60% of Republican voters favored the plan.

On June 20, 2021, Senator Bernie Sanders stated that he would not support paying for the bill via a proposed gas tax or a surcharge on electric vehicles.

On June 28, 2021, Sunrise Movement and several progressive representatives performed a protest at the White House in criticism of the size and scope of Biden's Civilian Climate Corps. Several protesters were arrested for blocking White House entrances.

On July 6, the 58-member bipartisan House Problem Solvers Caucus stated their support for the bipartisan bill and called for an expeditious and independent House vote. On July 21, a group of 65 former governors and mayors endorsed the plan.

Ahead of a procedural vote on August 7, former president Donald Trump attacked the bill and said he would support Republican primary challengers of senators who vote for it. He reiterated his criticisms following the bill's passage by Congress.

Following the bill's passage by Congress in November, Trump criticized it as containing "only 11% for real Infrastructure", calling it "the Elect Democrats in 2022/24 Act", and attacked Republicans who had supported it, saying in particular that McConnell had lent "lifelines to those who are destroying" the country. Various House Republicans also criticized the 13 Republican representatives who voted for the bill. Lauren Boebert described them as "RINOS" (Republican in Name Only). Mary Miller called them "spineless" and said they helped enact a "socialist takeover". Marjorie Taylor Greene called them "traitors" and "American job & energy killers", who "are China-First and America-Last", because they "agree with Globalist Joe [Biden] that America must depend on China to drive" electric vehicles. Gary Palmer was criticized for touting funding for the Birmingham Northern Beltline that he added to the bill, while neglecting to mention that he voted against the final bill. Paul Gosar was also criticized for taking credit for the bill's funding for Kingman Airport despite voting against it. Several Republican governors who condemned the bill, including Kristi Noem of South Dakota and Greg Gianforte of Montana, accepted the funding and directed it to various programs.

=== Others ===
On June 22, the U.S. Chamber of Commerce, Business Roundtable and No Labels made a joint statement urging the president to consider a bipartisan bill. The former two groups have lobbied for the plan not to raise corporate taxes, and to instead impose user fees and borrow from other federal funds.

According to an early August Harvard CAPS-Harris Poll survey, about 72% of voters support the bill.

On September 24, leaders from the U.S. Conference of Mayors, the National League of Cities, the National Urban League, and other Black American advocacy groups signaled their support for the bill.

On September 25, Peter J. Wallison authored an opinion piece for The Hill in which he argued that Republicans should try to pass the bipartisan bill to prevent it from being used as further leverage to pass the reconciliation bill. Subsequently, Republican House leaders formally opposed the bipartisan bill.

"Historians, economists and engineers interviewed by The Associated Press welcomed Biden's efforts. But they stressed that $1 trillion was not nearly enough to overcome the government's failure for decades to maintain and upgrade the country's infrastructure."

The think tank Transportation for America praised the House version of the bill, but heavily criticized the Senate version for its shortcomings on safety, climate resilience, long-term transit and rail funding and transit-oriented development, and maintenance spending, though it later noted that the final version that became law made small steps to address them.

The nuclear industry favored the legislation as it signaled continued federal government support.

Polling from Third Way and Impact Research released in July 2022 showed that only 24% of voters were aware the bill was signed into law, despite House Democrats holding over 1,000 events to promote it.

Reception to the drunk driver detection and distraction detection requirements have been mixed. Mothers Against Drunk Driving praised the requirement as "the beginning of the end of drunk driving". In contrast, the American Civil Liberties Union has expressed concern that the technology developed could pose a severe privacy risk to drivers if it collects or stores unnecessary data. Writing for Vice, Aaron Gordon also argued that the technology is likely to have an unacceptably high false-positive rate — existing ignition interlock devices that are sometimes installed after drunk driving convictions are prone to catastrophic failures.

In October 2023, the Natural Resources Defense Council criticized the IIJA's hydrogen hubs program for its lack of transparency, emphasizing the need for detailed technical reports, public hearings to thwart local NIMBYism and skepticism of hydrogen, and incorporation of environmental justice advocates into project leadership.

== Trump administration actions ==
In January 2025, the incoming Trump administration froze selected IIJA grants. However, that April, federal judge Mary McElroy ruled on a case brought by Rhode Island conservation groups that the IIJA grants had to be unfrozen, citing constitutionality concerns.

Throughout 2026, the Trump administration and House Republicans worked on the successor to the IIJA's surface transportation provisions, the BUILD America 250 Act, which would include several proposals to streamline environmental reviews for infrastructure, enhance railroad safety and give states more flexibility in funding highway programs, but also cut funding for the IIJA's electric vehicle and transit programs, and impose fees on electric vehicles, as well as pre-empt state laws governing autonomous taxis and bar non-English speakers from obtaining driver's licenses.

In August 2026, Secretary of Energy Chris Wright announced that the DOE would not move forward with the three designated NIETCs in Lake Erie, the Dakotas and the Oklahoma Panhandle, citing the Biden administration's "climate alarmist agenda" affecting grid reliability. The previous month, the Trump administration had released the 2026 draft National Transmission Needs Study, which noted the continued necessity of new interregional transmission.

== See also ==
- CHIPS and Science Act of 2022
- Inflation Reduction Act of 2022
- Infrastructure policy of Donald Trump
