= Ogden Theatre =

Venue in Denver, Colorado, United States

Coordinates: 39°44′25″N 104°58′29″W

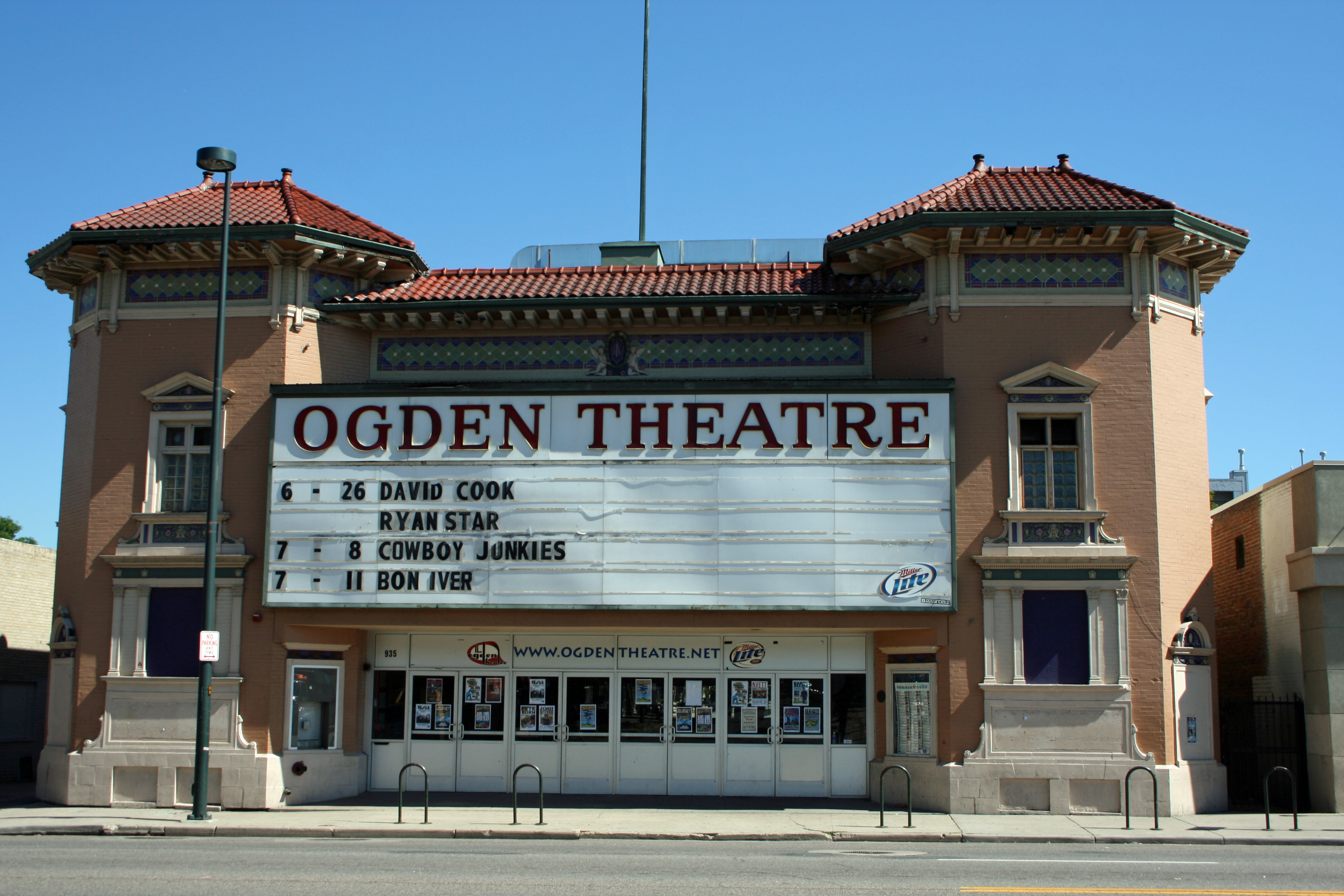
- Interactive map of Ogden Theatre
- Former names: Fox Theatres, National General Cinemas (NGC), Mann Theatres and Landmark Theater (1977-90)
- Address: 935 E Colfax Ave; Denver, CO 80218-1914
- Location: Capitol Hill
- Owner: Doug Kauffman
- Operator: AEG Rocky Mountains
- Capacity: 1,600
- Current use: Music venue

Construction
- Groundbreaking: November 13, 1916; 109 years ago
- Opened: September 6, 1917; 109 years ago
- Closed: 1990; 36 years ago
- Reopened: September 2, 1993; 33 years ago
- Rebuilt: 1974, 1993, 2006
- Architect: Harry W. J. Edbrooke

Website
- Venue website
- Ogden Theatre
- U.S. National Register of Historic Places
- Colorado State Register of Historic Properties
- Architectural style: Late 19th and 20th century revivals, Mediterranean Revival
- NRHP reference No.: 95001055
- CSRHP No.: 5DV.2609
- Added to NRHP: August 31, 1995

The Ogden Theatre is a music venue and former movie theater in Denver, Colorado, United States. Located at 935 E. Colfax Avenue in the neighborhood of Capitol Hill, it was built in 1917 and has a maximum capacity of 1,600 for concerts. It is listed on the National Register of Historic Places.

== History ==
The Ogden Theatre was part of the Fox Theater circuit of movie theaters. After the DOJ ordered divestiture of the exhibition theatre division of Fox, the theatre was acquired by National General Corporation (NGC). In 1970, the theater underwent a major remodel that included a new marquee, a complete remodel of the lobby and auditorium including main floor seating and loge seating in the balcony, acoustics, and the conversion of the screen to play anamorphic and flat features. The remodel also included an update to play both optical and four-track magnetic film soundtracks. In 1977, the theatre was acquired by Mann Theatres when it purchased Nation General Corporation's theater business. In the 1980s, it was a revival house that featured the cult movie classic, The Rocky Horror Picture Show every Saturday night. The inside and outside of the Ogden Theatre have been renovated many times throughout the years, as well as a host of different marquee signs have been used. The flat marquee on the theater was added during a major remodel in the 1970s and was upgraded in 1993.

When the Ogden closed for film exhibition in 1990, its Rocky Horror screenings and other repertory programming transferred to the nearby Esquire Theatre, where Rocky Horror continued uninterrupted until 2024.

In the late 1980s, ownership of the theater changed hands numerous times until the theater was closed in 1990. The theatre was marked for demolition until Doug Kauffman of the independent live music promoter Nobody In Particular Presents purchased the building in 1992. Kauffman's vision was to turn the Ogden Theater into a premier music venue.

The Ogden Theatre was re-opened in 1993 and current hosts approximately 150 concerts per year. In 2006, NIPP leased the venue to AEG Live.

Colorado bands that played at the Ogden Theatre include The Fray with OneRepublic in 2011, 3OH!3 in '09, Flobots in '10, Pretty Lights in '13, The Lumineers in 2015, and A Place For Owls.

== Popular culture ==
In the 2002 movie About Schmidt, Jack Nicholson drives by the theater in his motor home when he pulls into Denver.

Hip hop artists Atmosphere mention the Ogden Theater in their song "National Disgrace" - "Last thing I remember was the Ogden Theatre in the backstage bathroom, making out with all three of ya..."

== See also ==
- Fillmore Auditorium
