= Jael Holzman =

American journalist and musician

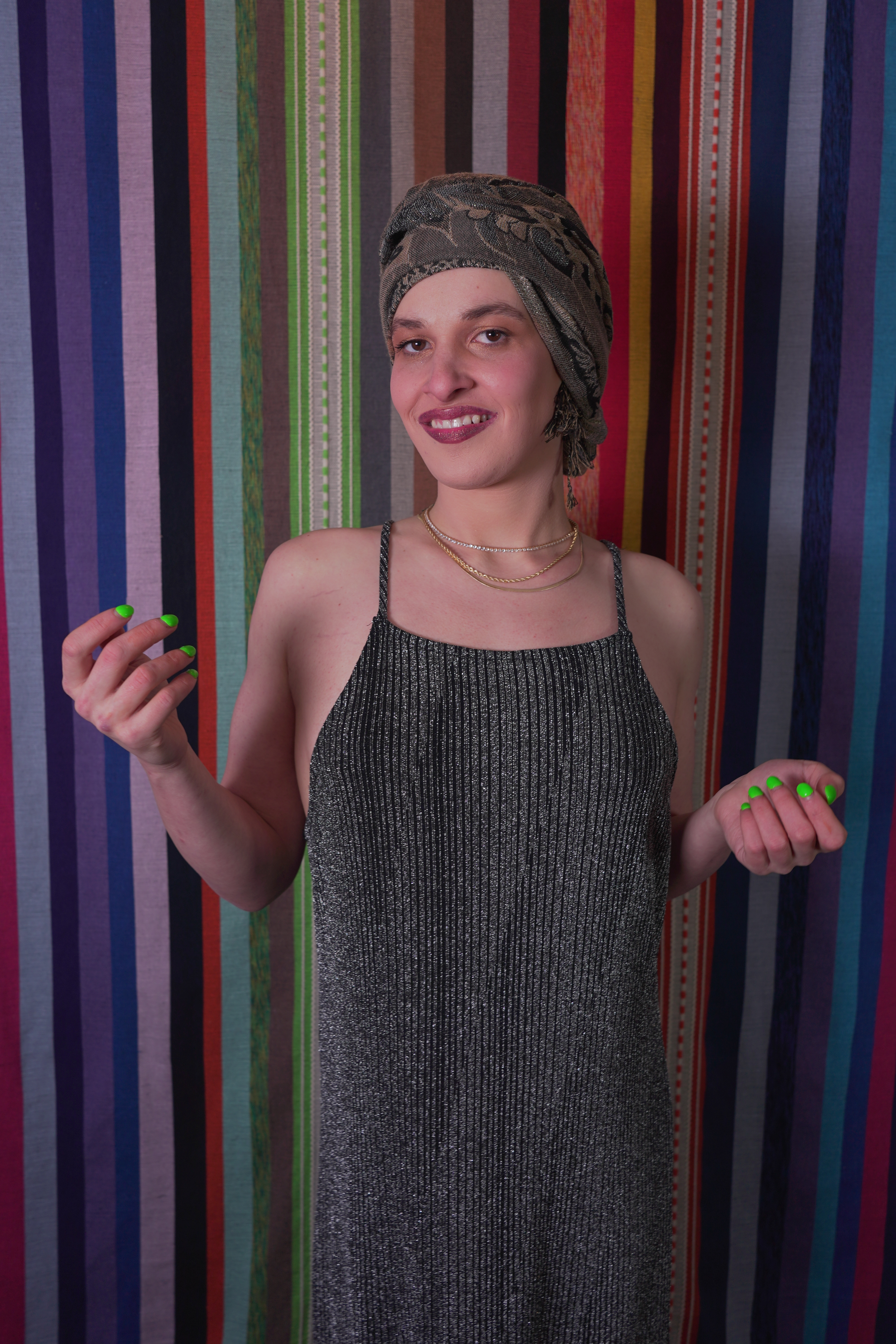
- Holzman in 2023.
- Born: Rockville, Maryland, U.S.
- Education: University of Vermont
- Occupations: Climate reporter Songwriter, vocalist, and bassist for Ekko Astral
- Employers: Congressional Quarterly (2017–2020); S&P Global Market Intelligence (2020–2021); E&E News (2021–2022); Axios (2022–2024); Heatmap News (2024–present)
- Notable work: Pink Balloons

Jael Holzman is an American journalist and musician who reports on climate change, renewable energy, and mining.

She has worked for Congressional Quarterly, S&P Global Market Intelligence, E&E News, and Axios. Since July 2024, she has been a senior reporter for Heatmap News.

In 2021, Jael co-founded the punk rock band Ekko Astral, for which she is the lead vocalist and (since 2024) the bass guitarist. The band's first album Pink Balloons was released through Topshelf Records on April 17, 2024, garnering critical acclaim.

== Early life and background ==
Jael Holzman was born in Rockville, Maryland, where she attended Rockville High School.

She has spoken about having been particularly close to her maternal grandfather, Manny, who died in 2023. A Korean War veteran and Bronze Star Medal recipient, Manny spent most of his working life making cars for Chrysler and was the head of his local union chapter. In 1967, he was living in Detroit when the city was the scene of one of the worst riots in US history. Jael describes how, afterward, he took Holzman's mother and aunt out to look at the ruins and "actually have a conversation with them about why the riots were happening."

From 2013–2017, Holzman studied at the University of Vermont, where she was awarded a Bachelor's Degree in English Language and Literature.

== Journalism career ==
In 2016, Holzman interned for the New England Center for Investigative Reporting in Boston.

=== Early congressional career ===
In January 2017, during the week of the first inauguration of Donald Trump as US President, Holzman started working as a congressional reporter on Capitol Hill.

She initially worked for Congressional Quarterly's Roll Call as a legislative researcher, before taking on the role of energy and environment reporter in May 2018.

From February 2020 until October 2021, she worked as a metals and mining reporter for S&P Global Market Intelligence. During this time she covered the impact of the COVID-19 pandemic on the metals market.

From October 2021 until November 2022, Holzman worked as a mining reporter for E&E News (owned by Politico).

In November 2022, she started working for Axios as an energy and climate reporter, where she was the author of a new energy and climate policy newsletter. On January 17, 2023, she appeared on C-SPAN, where she discussed the energy and climate policy goals in the House Republicans' "Commitment to America" plan.

=== Departure from congressional journalism ===
On May 22, 2024, it was reported that Holzman would be leaving Axios. On June 1, 2024, Holzman published an article through Medium entitled Why I'm leaving congressional journalism.

In the article, she writes about coming out as a trans woman in 2021 while working at the Capitol, as well as the subsequent experience of being one of the only openly transgender reporters on the Hill. Although Holzman states unambiguously that she faced no discrimination while working in Congress, she cites multiple negative incidents where she disagreed with her colleagues' reporting on stories relevant to the LGBTQ+ community, which led to her becoming disillusioned with her job.

=== Heatmap News ===
On June 20, 2024, it was reported that Holzman had been hired as a senior reporter for Heatmap News. She is the author of their newsletter The Fight, which covers "local conflicts in the energy transition."

In November 2025, Holzman received SEAL Awards Environmental Journalism Award for her reporting in Heatmap News.

== Music career ==
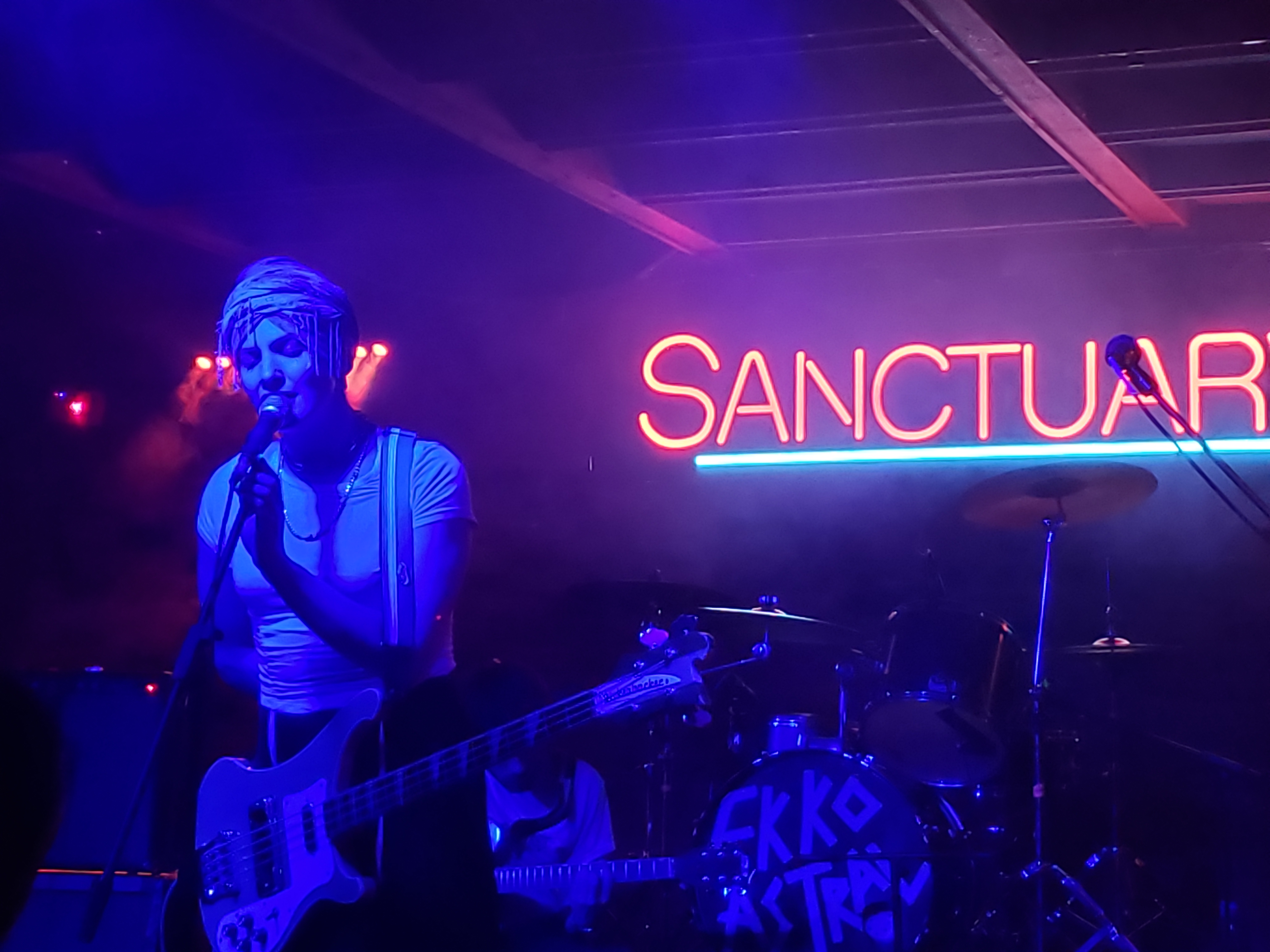
Holzman (front) performing with Ekko Astral in 2024.

While attending the University of Vermont, Jael Holzman started playing music together with fellow student Liam Hughes. Despite going separate ways following graduation, Holzman reached out to Hughes after finding out he would be moving to Washington, D.C. in 2021. Together they formed the band Ekko Astral, with Holzman as vocalist and Hughes as guitarist. They would eventually be joined by Miri Tyler (on drums), Guinevere Tully (on bass), and Sam Elmore (on rhythm guitar).

Initially, Ekko Astral was a way for Holzman and Hughes to make music during the COVID-19 pandemic, and for Holzman to, in her words, "vent about what it’s like to be me right now" in regards to her experience transitioning during this time period. The band plays a style of rock music that draws influence from punk music, post-punk, noise rock, and queercore. The band self-describes their music as "mascara moshpit".

On October 28, 2022, Ekko Astral released an EP, Quartz. This was followed by a live EP, entitled The Quartz Farewell.

On February 14, 2024, the band announced that they had signed with Topshelf Records.

Ekko Astral's first studio album, Pink Balloons, was released on April 17, 2024, to critical acclaim. Pitchfork named it their best rock album of 2024, while NPR praised the single "devorah", and placed the album in their annual Top 50 list.

Tully left the group in July 2024, and Elmore left in September 2024. Holzman took on bass guitar duties as a result.

In 2024, Ekko Astral joined Idles for part of their tour of the Southern US.

In May 2024, Holzman stated that the band was working on a concept album about the Beltway.

In 2025, Ekko Astral organized, alongside the Gender Liberation Movement, the music festival Liberation Weekend at Black Cat in Washington D.C. Taking place on May 30th and 31st, the festival featured the band performing alongside other musicians and bands like Home Is Where, Speedy Ortiz, Bartees Strange, and Ted Leo. The festival raised $30,000 for the Movement. The second edition of the festival took place from April 24th to the 26th at Black Cat, and featured Laura Jane Grace, hardcore band Pissed Jeans, black metal duo Ragana, and Ezra Furman among many others.

== Discography ==
- Ekko Astral – Quartz (2022)
- Ekko Astral – The Quartz Farewell (2023)
- Ekko Astral – Pink Balloons (2024)
