= Josaleigh Pollett =

- Genres: Indie, Electronic, Folk
- Occupation: Musician
- Labels: Audio Antihero, Cupboard Music, Lavender Vinyl

Josaleigh Pollett is a Salt Lake City-based non-binary musician and singer-songwriter.

== Music career ==
=== Early releases and performances, debut album (2012–2020) ===
Josaleigh Pollett grew up in Salt Lake City and began writing and self-releasing their songs as a teenager, while performing solo sets. In 2014, they contributed vocals to the Salt Lake City: A Love Story album by Charles Ellsworth and Vincent Draper.

In 2017, they issued their debut album, Strangers, on Lavender Vinyl on July 8.

=== Sophomore album and collaboration with Jordan Watko (2020–2022) ===
In 2020, Pollett began collaborating with Crowd Shy (Jordan Watko). The creation of their second album used a full-band lineup, and No Woman Is the Sea was released on March 12, 2020, again through Lavender Vinyl. The album was re-issued on CD by Cupboard Music and cassette via Lavender Vinyl in 2023.

The following year, Pollett issued Bedroom Demos 2021, recorded a You Have Until Lunch session, and supported St. Vincent.

Pollett also collaborated with Icarus Phoenix on releases in 2021 and 2022.

=== In the Garden, By the Weeds and other collaborations (2023–2025) ===
Pollett's third album, In the Garden, By the Weeds, was released on July 14, 2023. The album was again made in collaboration with Watko, before his relocation to Japan.

In the Garden, By the Weeds peaked at No.110 in the NACC 200 on January 9, 2024.

In 2024, Pollett issued a remixed edition of the previous year's album, and collaborated with Scott Lippitt, and Ekko Astral. The latter collaboration, "i90," was re-released as a live version the following year.

Pollett was awarded "Best Singer-Songwriter of 2024" by Salt Lake City Weekly.

=== Collaborations, new material, and If I Let It Quiet (2025–present) ===
Pollett began 2025 with a collaboration with phoneswithchords and a daily songwriting challenge, which was released as bro's bad january.

They performed at the Kilby Block Party in May.

On October 28, they released the "Radio Player" single with Watko, through the Audio Antihero label.

In May 2026, Pollett announced the 'If I Let It Quiet' album, and debuted a new single, "The Witness," on Post-Trash. The album was an international collaboration between Pollett in the US and Watko, who had relocated to Osaka, Japan. The pair wrote and recorded the entire album from separate locations with assistance from Andrew Golding, who offered additional production and instrumentation.

The second single, "Like a River," was released on June 23, after a premiere with Under the Radar.

On July 3, Pollett contributed vocals to the "Son of Man" single by A Place for Owls.

"Bed of Quiet," the final single from If I Let It Quiet was released on July 14, after premiering with KLOF Magazine the day prior. The single included a sample provided by Chris Walla, and was included in Stereogum's and BrooklynVegan's songs of the week features.

The If I Let It Quiet LP was premiered with God Is In the TV on July 23, and released via Audio Antihero and Lavender Vinyl the following day. Watko returned to the US tour the album with Pollett, which was accompanied by sessions for KRCL, WORT KaterFM, and KGNU.If I Let It Quiet debuted at No.79 in the NACC 200 chart on August 5, and remained in the chart until September 15, peaking at No. 70 on September 1.

== Discography ==
=== Albums ===
- Strangers (Lavender Vinyl, 2017)
- No Woman Is the Sea - with Crowd Shy (Lavender Vinyl, 2020 / Cupboard Music, 2023)
- In the Garden, By the Weeds - with Crowd Shy (Lavender Vinyl, 2023)
- If I Let It Quiet - with Crowd Shy (Audio Antihero / Lavender Vinyl, 2026)

=== Singles ===
- "Crying Wolf" - with Crowd Shy (Self-Released, 2019)
- "Craiglistless" - with Crowd Shy (Self-Released, 2019)
- "No Man is an Island" [Crowd Shy Remix] - with Crowd Shy (Self-Released, 2019)
- "bad dreams" [Recovery Version] (Self-Released, 2022)
- "Cinderblocks" (Self-Released, 2022)
- "Bodies" [Kilby Version] (Self-Released, 2023)
- "The Nothing Answered Back" (Self-Released, 2023)
- "YKWIM" [Pacing Remix] - with Crowd Shy (Self-Released, 2024)
- "Not Easy, Not Forever" [Color Temperature Remix] - with Crowd Shy (Self-Released, 2024)
- "Radio Player" - with Crowd Shy (Audio Antihero, 2025)
- "The Witness" - with Crowd Shy (Audio Antihero, 2026)
- "Like a River" - with Crowd Shy (Audio Antihero, 2026)
- "Bed of Quiet" - with Crowd Shy (Audio Antihero, 2026)

=== Compilations ===
- Bedroom Demos 2021 (Self-Released, 2021)
- No Woman is the Sea [Anniversary Edition] (Lavender Vinyl, 2023)
- In the Garden, By the Remixes (Self-Released, 2024)
- bro's bad january (Self-Released, 2025)

=== Other credits ===
- Charles Ellsworth & Vincent Draper - Salt Lake City: A Love Story (Wandering Man Records, 2014) – Vocals ("Stuck Out in Texas")
- Various Artists - HAGS (Timesuck, 2019) – Contributes "Talk to Me Devil, Again"
- Icarus Phoenix - "Anthem" (Telos Tapes, 2021) – Vocals
- Icarus Phoenix - "Too Many Hands" (Telos Tapes, 2022) – Vocals
- Icarus Phoenix - Sometimes Our Shadow Gets in the Way (Telos Tapes, 2022) – Vocals ("Too Many Hands")
- Various Artists - Death by Salt V (SLUG, 2022) – Contributes "Cinderblocks"
- Various Artists - Another Distance to Fall: A Tribute to Sebadoh - with Jordan Watko (Totally Real Records, 2022) – Contributes "Trees"
- Slow Fawns - Isolation II (Joyful Noise Recordings, 2022) – Vocals ("Drifting")
- Various Artists - From the River to the Sea: The Horrible Truth About Palestine (Audio Antihero, 2023) – Contributes "Something Pretty"
- Scott Lippett - "Is This a Good Time?" (Self-Released, 2024)
- Scott Lippett - Me, You, and the Avenues (Self-Released, 2024) – Vocals ("Is This a Good Time?")
- Ekko Astral - pink balloons (Topshelf Records, 2024) – Vocals ("I90")
- phoneswithchords - "put pressure" (Amiable Alley Cat Music, 2025) – Vocals
- phoneswithchords - piecemeal (Amiable Alley Cat Music, 2025) – Vocals ("put pressure")
- Spirit Assembly - Sun Faded Things (Mountain Time Zone, 2026) – Vocals ("Hyperion")
- Various Artists - Everyone's Bad January (No Label, 2026) – Contributes "A Letter to Myself" & "Injury"
- A Place for Owls & All Thieves - "Son of Man" (Broom of Destruction Records, 2026) – Vocals
