= Death by Salt =

Death By Salt
- Also known as: DBS
- Born: February 2004
- Origin: SLUG Magazine
- Genres: Indie rock
- Occupation: Compiling Salt Lake's rich musical history
- Label: Eighteen-Percent Gray
- Website: www.deathbysalt.com

Death By Salt is SLUG Magazine's signature local music compilation series. Its name refers to the vulnerability of slugs to salt. Beginning in 2004, there are currently 6 volumes in the series.

Together, Volumes I & II feature exclusive tracks from over 100 Utah bands. Each box set comes with extensive printed extras such as a 64-page color booklet and band trading cards. It is the most comprehensive music compilation to ever document the Utah scene. DBS III was released on 21 December 2007 and is the scene's first-ever local music compilation offered on vinyl. It makes the first in a series of genre-specific DBS releases from SLUG Magazine.

== Death By Salt I ==
Death by Salt I, released February 2004, is a triple-disc offering of 59 Utah bands. Of the comp, editor Angela Brown comments that, "Nothing this big has ever been done before to promote the SLC music scene, and that's simply because there has never been as much talent here as there is now. There are too many groups and artists here from every genre that do not deserve to be ignored."

The Utah music scene is one of the most distinctive in the nation due to its geographical isolation and outlaw/religious heritage. Largely cut off from the outside world and influenced most strongly by each other, local musicians spawn unique musical creations saturated with sincerity. The majority of Salt Lake musicians eschew ulterior motives; they make music in order to express themselves and to create an alternate world to the conservative culture that surrounds them.

== Death By Salt II ==
Death by Salt II, released March 3, 2006, is a double-disc offering of 42 Utah bands and is SLUG Magazine's follow-up to 2004's triple-CD local band comp. The quality of the tracks submitted this time was higher and the selection process more rigorous, making the final project even more polished, cohesive and stellar than before.

Death by Salt II is beautifully packaged in two silver tins with a wide connecting paper band. Inside, trading cards of each of the bands gives a visual image of each group along with a brief bio, local record label (if applicable) and contact information. Artwork for the comp was conceived and created by SLC artist Trent Call and graphics and design concepts were conceived and executed by Shon Taylor, owner of Bottlerocket Manufacturing.

The 42 bands on Death by Salt II cover many different genres, from math metal to garage rock to electronica to gritty blues. Both discs are loosely separated for listening flow: The first disc contains harder rock music and the second disc generally catalogues the softer and more eclectic side of Salt Lake music.

== Death By Salt III ==
Death by Salt III, released December 21, 2007, features 10 Utah bands on the first ever local compilation offered on vinyl, and the first in a series of genre-specific DBS releases from SLUG Magazine. Limited to only 1,000 records, DBS III features rock music from the Salt Lake music scene.

DBS III was beautifully designed by Paul Butterfield and Dave Styer, revolves around the theme of early Mormon resistance and rebellion against the federal government during Utah's nascent statehood. It celebrates the early courage of Utah's leaders, touching on the irony of their non-conformity 100 years before Utah became one of the most conservative states in the nation. Included is a newsprint zine containing full interviews and photos with each of the 10 Salt Lake bands featured on DBS III. A downloadable version of the music is included with every vinyl purchase.

== "Death By Salt IV" ==
"Death by Salt IV", released Friday, July 18, 2008, features 13 Utah bands and is the second in a series of genre-specific DBS releases from SLUG Magazine. Limited to only 200 CDs, DBS IV features noise, avant garde and experimental beat music from the Salt Lake music scene.

The CD jackets of DBS IV were skillfully crafted by Cien Watson and Jen Sorensen of The Rookery and were screen-printed and sewn by hand. A silver gelatin photograph of each artist lines the inside of the gatefold. Each track on the album is self-produced and exclusive to the compilation, ranging from extreme black noise to ambient to post-industrial.

The Utah music scene is unusual due to its geographical isolation and outlaw/religious heritage. Largely cut off from the outside world and influenced most strongly by each other, local musicians spawn unique musical creations saturated with sincerity. The majority of Salt Lake musicians eschew ulterior motives; they make music in order to express themselves and to create an alternate world to the conservative culture that surrounds them.

Track Listing: 1. AODL - Stroke It Flakey 2. Night Terror - Kill The Neighbors 3. NJ Foster - Huffstuffn'guff 4. Pussycat Galataca - Owsley Soaked Headband 5. Nolens Volens - Das Reizvolle Berechnung 6. 1h86335 - Gr33nland 7. nonnon - Rimmung II 8. VCR5 - Warriors 9. Tenants of Balthazar's Castle - Rain Dream 10. Hew Mun - Can You Hear My 11. I Hate Girls With Bruises - Fetish Grinder 12. Mafu - Black Diamonds(Nolens Volens RMX) 13. Kqwiet - Prelude to an ElectricWake

== "Death By Salt V" ==
Death By Salt V is SLUG Magazine's fifth official compilation album that features music from 13 local garage rock bands. This series returned in June 2015 after 7 years and showcases the diverse music scene in Salt Lake. The bands featured on this edition have a range of influences from hardcore to psych to post-punk, all rooted in a DIY ethic that can be connected to garage rock. Featuring exclusive tracks by Swamp Ravens, Breakers, Foster Body, JAWWZZ, The Nods, Albino Father, The Pentagraham Crackers, Beat Hotel, Koala Temple, The Troubles, Dark Seas, Super 78 and Color Animal. It is a testament to the greatness of the Utah music scene, as a companion piece to the album, SLUG has written up a comprehensive history of the series in the June 2015 issue (Issue #318), documenting its formation and transformation up until the release of DBS V.

This edition is limited to 1,000 pieces pressed to multi-colored vinyl and comes with a digital download code. The music consists of exclusive tracks from each band, never before found on other albums or releases. The art and design was a collaboration between artists Sean Hennefer, Matt Hoenes and Joshua Joye. The album and past DBS compilations will be available digitally on iTunes.

== "Death By Salt VI" ==
Released Feb. 12, 2022 during SLUG Magazine's 33rd Anniversary Party, Death By Salt Vol. VI is the sixth edition of Death By Salt and the first cassette tape release in the series. This edition takes a catch-all approach to curation and showcases the breadth of the state's current musical landscape—from punk to R&B to electronic and more. Eclecticism being this version's focus, Death By Salt VI features 10 local artists from different and unique corners: Lord Vox, Josaleigh Pollett, LAST, The Aces, Jay Warren, Marqueza, The Ph03nix Child, Jacob T. Skeen, Bobo and Choice Coin.

Only 250 copies of Death By Salt Vol. VI were printed and made available to the public. With the help of Barnstock (non-profit that benefits charitable organizations through the arts), a portion of the proceeds of Death By Salt Vol. VI was donated to MICA (Mestizo Institute of Culture and Arts). SLUG's Lead Designer Joshua Joye worked with artist Alethia Lunares to design and finalize the art on the cover, tape insert and tape itself.
