= Pink Balloons =

Studio album by Ekko Astral
- Released: April 17, 2024
- Studios: Fidelitorium, Kernersville, North Carolina
- Genres: Noise punk; art rock; post-hardcore; riot grrrl
- Length: 35:40
- Label: Topshelf
- Producer: Jeremy Snyder

Pink Balloons (stylized as pink balloons) is the only studio album by Washington, D.C.–based punk band Ekko Astral.

== Recording and composition ==
Pink Balloons was recorded and produced by Jeremy Snyder, of Brooklyn-based band Pure Adult. The group had released their most recent album at the same time writing for Pink Balloons had begun; in an interview for Stereogum, singer Jael Holzman drew a positive comparison between Snyder's chaotic production style and what she saw as the ongoing state of the world.

Lyrically, Pink Balloons focuses on themes such as feeling unsafe as a woman in public, facing discrimination and transmisogyny, and the historical treatment of disadvantaged communities, including Native Americans in the United States. The title of the record was intended to be a reaction against the mainstream commodification of feminism. This theme is expanded upon in songs such as "On Brand"; described as the album's climax by Holzman, the band has said the song is "dedicated to all the people in DC who make money off people dying". The social commentary present in the album is often interspersed with cultural references. Pink Balloons features wordplay based around Bon Iver, Frank Ocean, and Creedence Clearwater Revival among others; the title of "Somewhere at the Bottom of the River Between L'Enfant and Eastern Market" references La Dispute's album Somewhere at the Bottom of the River Between Vega and Altair, while "Sticks and Stones" references Dave Chappelle's controversial stand-up special of the same name.

In April 2025, Ekko Astral released Pink Balloons: Popped (stylized as pink balloons: popped) to commemorate the first anniversary of the album. The reissue features the original eleven tracks from Pink Balloons along with five new, remixed bonus tracks, as well as new cover art from Mattie Lubchansky.

== Reception ==
Professional ratings
Review scores
Source	Rating
Paste	8.9/10
Pitchfork	8.0/10

Pink Balloons received positive reviews from critics. Writing for the album's inclusion in Consequence's "Best Albums of April 2024" list, critic J. Krueger called the album "a genuinely exciting debut".

In June 2024, two months after the album's release, Pink Balloons was named as one of Stereogum's "50 Best Albums of 2024 So Far". The same month, album closing track "I90" was named one of Paste's "50 Best Songs of 2024 So Far".

In December 2024, Pink Balloons was listed at No. 1 in Pitchfork's list of "The 30 Best Rock Albums of 2024" with the track "Head Empty Blues" included in their "The 100 Best Songs of 2024" list. Pink Balloons was named in NPR's list of "The 50 Best Albums of 2024"; the track "Head Empty Blues" also earned a spot on NPR's list of "The Best Songs of 2024". Uproxx also included Pink Balloons in their list of "The Best Albums of 2024".

== Track listing ==
All lyrics by Jael Holzman, except where noted.

No.	Title	Lyrics	Length
1.	"Head Empty Blues"		2:48
2.	"Baethoven"		2:46
3.	"uwu Type Beat"		2:29
4.	"On Brand"		4:25
5.	"Somewhere at the Bottom of the River Between L'Enfant and Eastern Market"	Ari Drennen	2:23
6.	"Make Me Young"	Guinevere Tully	1:08
7.	"Sticks and Stones"		3:02
8.	"Buffaloed"		1:51
9.	"Devorah"		5:41
10.	"Burning Alive on K St."	instrumental	0:30
11.	"I90" (featuring Josaleigh Pollett)	Holzman, Drennen	8:37
Total length:			35:40

Pink Balloons: Popped - deluxe edition
No.	Title	Length
12.	"Pomegranate Tree"	6:15
13.	"Shred Empty Blues" (Popped Version featuring Mikie Mayo & dreamrats)	2:34
14.	"Uwuwu" (Popped Version featuring pet wife)	2:43
15.	"Unbrand" (Popped Version featuring They Hate Change)	4:25
16.	"Sticks and Stones" (radio edit)	2:39
Total length:		54:16

== Personnel ==
Ekko Astral

- Jael Holzman – vocals, cover art
- Liam Hughes – lead guitar, organ (track 2), synthesizer (tracks 3 and 4), rhythm guitar (track 6), Wurlitzer (track 11)
- Sam Elmore – rhythm guitar
- Guinevere Tully – bass guitar, vocals (track 6)
- Miri Tyler – drums, synthesizer (track 4), organ (tracks 6 and 7), percussion (tracks 1, 3, and 9)

Additional personnel

- Jeremy Snyder – producer, percussion (tracks 1, 3, and 4), vocals (track 9)
- Josaleigh Pollett - vocals (track 11)
- Carl Saff – mastering
- Kohei Kane – album cover photography
- John Lee – photography
- Pablo Manriquez – cover art
