= New England Center for Investigative Reporting =

Nonprofit investigative newsroom

- Abbreviation: NECIR
- Founded at: Boston, Massachusetts
- Fields: Investigative journalism
- Board of directors: Burt Glass
- Affiliations: Boston University, WGBH Educational Foundation

The New England Center for Investigative Reporting (NECIR) is a nonprofit investigative newsroom housed at WGBH News in Boston, Massachusetts. It was founded in 2009 by investigative journalists Joe Bergantino and Maggie Mulvihill, and was based at Boston University until July 2019.

== History ==
By 2008, the financial instabilities facing newspapers was leading to a precipitous decline in investigative reporting in New England and around the country. In January 2009, Joe Bergantino and Maggie Mulvihill –in collaboration with Boston University College of Communication Dean and former Miami Herald executive editor Tom Fiedler—launched NECIR to expose injustice by producing and teaching in-depth, impact-making journalism. NECIR-produced stories have appeared in The New York Times, The Washington Post, The Boston Globe, The Christian Science Monitor, USA TODAY, in mid-size newspapers across Massachusetts and New England and on radio and TV news outlets in the Boston area such as WGBH and WBUR. These stories have led to changes laws, policy and behavior. Past stories revealed:

- Unreported abuse, neglect and deaths of children monitored by Massachusetts child welfare officials, triggering to a public outcry and the governor’s decision to reform the assessment system used by the Department of Children and Families.
- Holes in an arson and murder conviction, leading directly to the release of a man who had served 30 years in prison for the crime.
- Poorly understood contracts for reverse home mortgages were forcing the elderly out of their homes, prompting readers to raise enough money to save one senior from eviction.
- Unacknowledged corporate influence over research and advocacy from some of the nation’s most respected policy “think tanks” in Washington.
- False reports by Boston’s Department of Public Works of pothole repairs, spurring the mayor to adopt a “311”city accountability call system.

=== Awards and recognition ===
One of the NECIR's investigations—a comprehensive look at mobile phone apps dispensing medical advice—ran in the Washington Post’s Health and Science section, on the Scripps News Service and on Hearst TV stations nationally.

In 2011, NECIR won two awards for its coverage of carbon offset fraud and shared a national award for an article on campus sexual assaults. It won several more awards in 2012 for a year-long investigation on the sentencing of juvenile killers, which was also cited in a brief to the U.S. Supreme Court. Another NECIR story, produced in collaboration with Boston inner-city high school students, prompted immediate state action and a Boston Globe editorial.

In 2014, NECIR received two awards from the New England Newspaper and Press Association. One award, the Yankee Quill Award, was given to Joe Bergantino for lifetime achievement, and the second award, a "Publick Occurrences" award, was given to the center for reports on child fatalities in the state's child welfare system.

In 2019, NECIR and WGBH won an Edward R. Morrow Award for reporting on the business of illicit massage parlors and a Sigma Delta Chi (SDX) Award for Public Service in Radio Journalism for a radio series about a wrongfully convicted man’s effort to rebuild his life after nearly four decades in prison

== Training ==
Effective July 2019, Boston University has taken over NECIR's Pre-College Summer Journalism Institute for high school students, with continued involvement of NECIR reporters.

== Staff ==
Paul Singer, investigations editor; Phillip Martin, senior investigative reporter; Jenifer McKim, senior reporter; Chris Burrell, investigative reporter
