= SLUG (magazine) =

US magazine

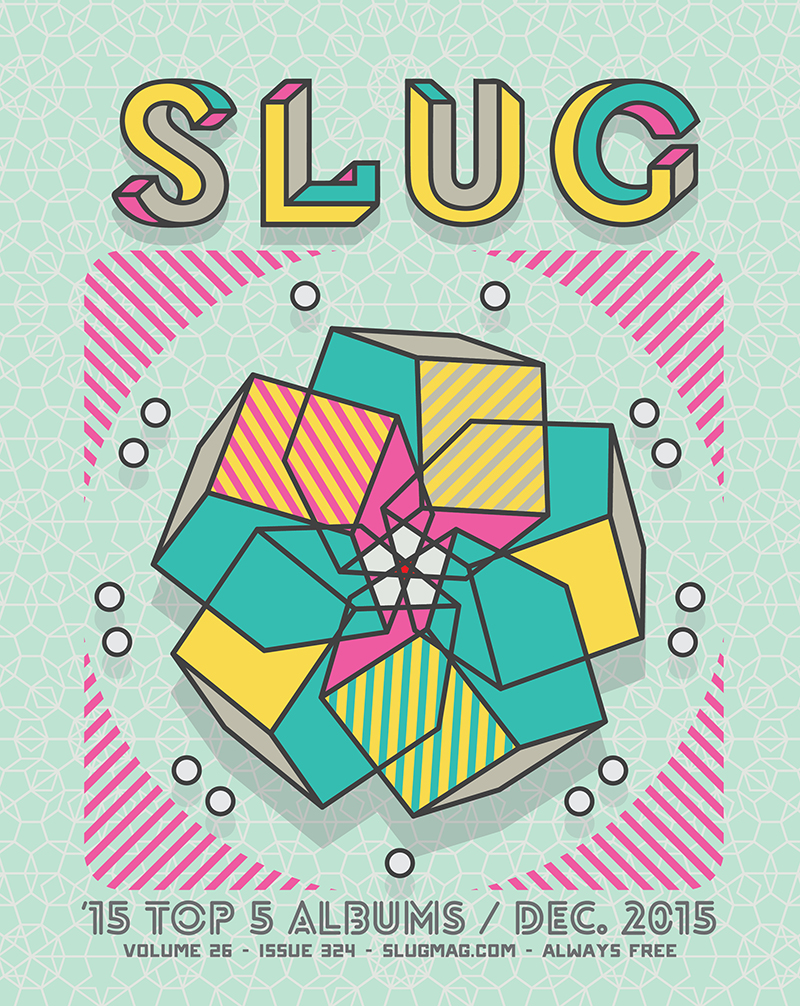
- SLUG Magazine Issue #325 (Dec 2015)
- Editor: Angela Brown
- Categories: Music, art, events, community
- Frequency: Monthly
- Circulation: 20,000
- Publisher: Eighteen Percent Gray
- First issue: December 1988
- Country: United States
- Based in: Salt Lake City, Utah
- Language: English
- Website: slugmag.com
- OCLC: 48819125

SLUG (SLUG being an acronym for Salt Lake UnderGround) is a free monthly magazine based in Salt Lake City, Utah. SLUG features music, lifestyle, arts and events with interviews, reviews and articles.

Established in 1989, SLUG has remained in print for over 34 years, making it one of Utah's longest-running independent magazines. They distribute over 20,000 copies across Utah each month. Angela H. Brown took ownership of SLUG in 2000, and is the current owner of the publication. Under her ownership, SLUG launched slugmag.com, which publishes online-exclusive content not found in the print issues.

The magazine's current tagline is “Causing A Scene Since 1989,” a reference to the magazine’s important role in documenting and promoting Salt Lake City’s local music scene since its inception.

== History ==
SLUG was founded in 1989 by JR Ruppel in Salt Lake City, Utah. Created in the back room of Salt Lake City Weekly (then The Private Eye) with the help of John Saltas, the first issue of SLUG was only four pages long, had a print run of less than 100 issues, and was printed using a photocopier. Early issues of SLUG were distributed in Salt Lake City and surrounding areas. In 1994, Ruppel sold the magazine to Gianni Ellefsen, who distributed SLUG nationally, as well as locally.

On November 9, 1999, Rick Ziegler, then owner of Salt City Records, received a cease and desist letter from Anne M. Wall, Brand Protection Manager for the Salt Lake Organizing Committee for the Olympic Winter Games of 2002, regarding ads that ran in the magazine. The magazine printed the letter in its December issue and adopted a phrase from it, “Neither Humorous Nor Appropriate,” as its slogan. In 2000, SLUG managing editor Angela H. Brown, an employee of SLUG since 1997, purchased the magazine from Ellefsen. Brown, a freelance writer and photographer from Utah, took the magazine back to its local roots, while also continuing the magazine’s coverage of national music acts.

In 2014, SLUG received 9 awards from the Utah Headliners Chapters of the Society of Professional Journalists. SLUG is now printed in color on newsprint. Since 2000, SLUG’s circulation has increased from 15,000 to 20,000 copies distributed to local businesses throughout Utah. In July 2011, SLUG launched its weekly podcast SLUG Soundwaves, an interview-format program that serves as an audio extension of the magazine’s coverage. SLUG’s monthly Localized showcase highlights the local alternative music culture of Salt Lake City.

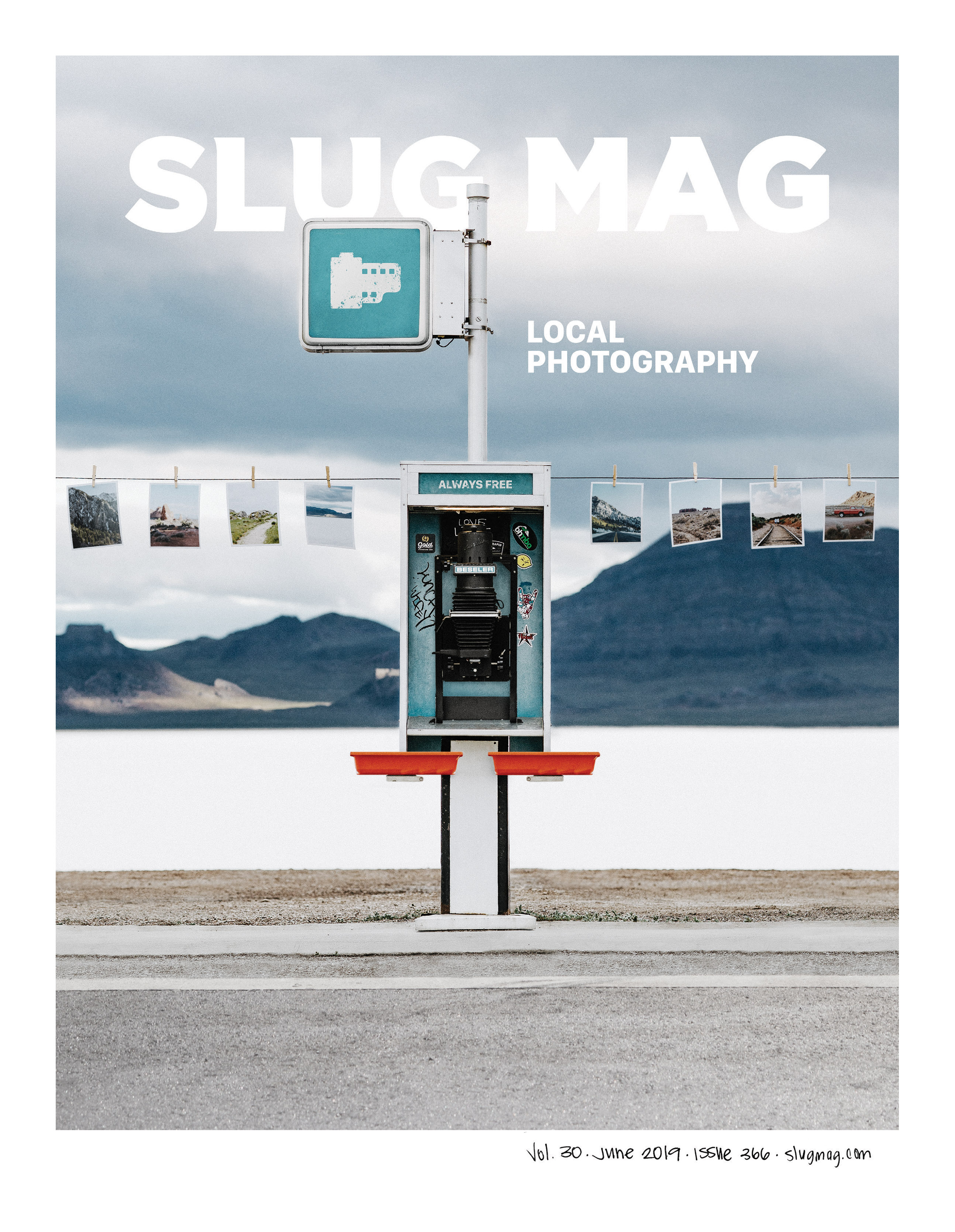
“Brent Courtney works a photo enlarger—which casts light through a film negative and onto photo paper—into a phone booth, celebrating old techniques. The presence of photo-paper trays underscores the many photo-making options we have in a contemporary setting amid digital photography.”. Artist: Brent Courtney

== Coverage ==
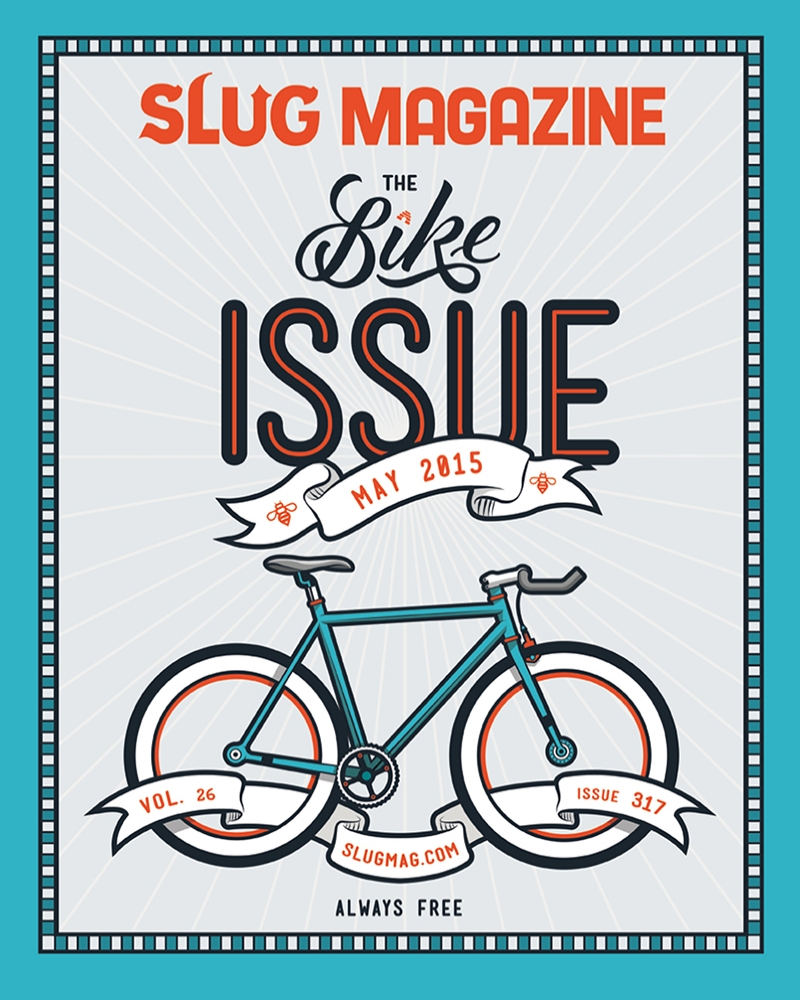
SLUG Magazine 317 Bike Issue

SLUG Magazine’s core focus is the Salt Lake community. However, SLUG is also known for its interview-based features with well-known personalities of underground music culture, like Henry Rollins, Michael Gira of Swans, and Dale Crover of Melvins—as well as local Utah bands such as The Stench, SubRosa, Cult Leader, and many others. SLUG has also maintained their monthly “Localized” feature, which spotlights two local Utah bands/acts and provides pre-coverage for a correlating show for the bands written about in the feature. It began in the May 2001 issue and has been a consistent feature ever since.

In the way of album/EP reviews, SLUG has provided review coverage of non-Utah acts since the second issue in January 1989, and local album reviews since the June 1989 issue, which are a cornerstone of the publication today. Since the first issue, SLUG has published show reviews of concerts, which currently run mainly on SLUGMag.com, though there are some print exceptions.

Beyond music, SLUG Magazine covers underground lifestyle, action sports and events throughout the region. Their coverage includes features about local Utah businesses and institutions, as well as people who are active in producing or promoting these subjects both locally and worldwide.

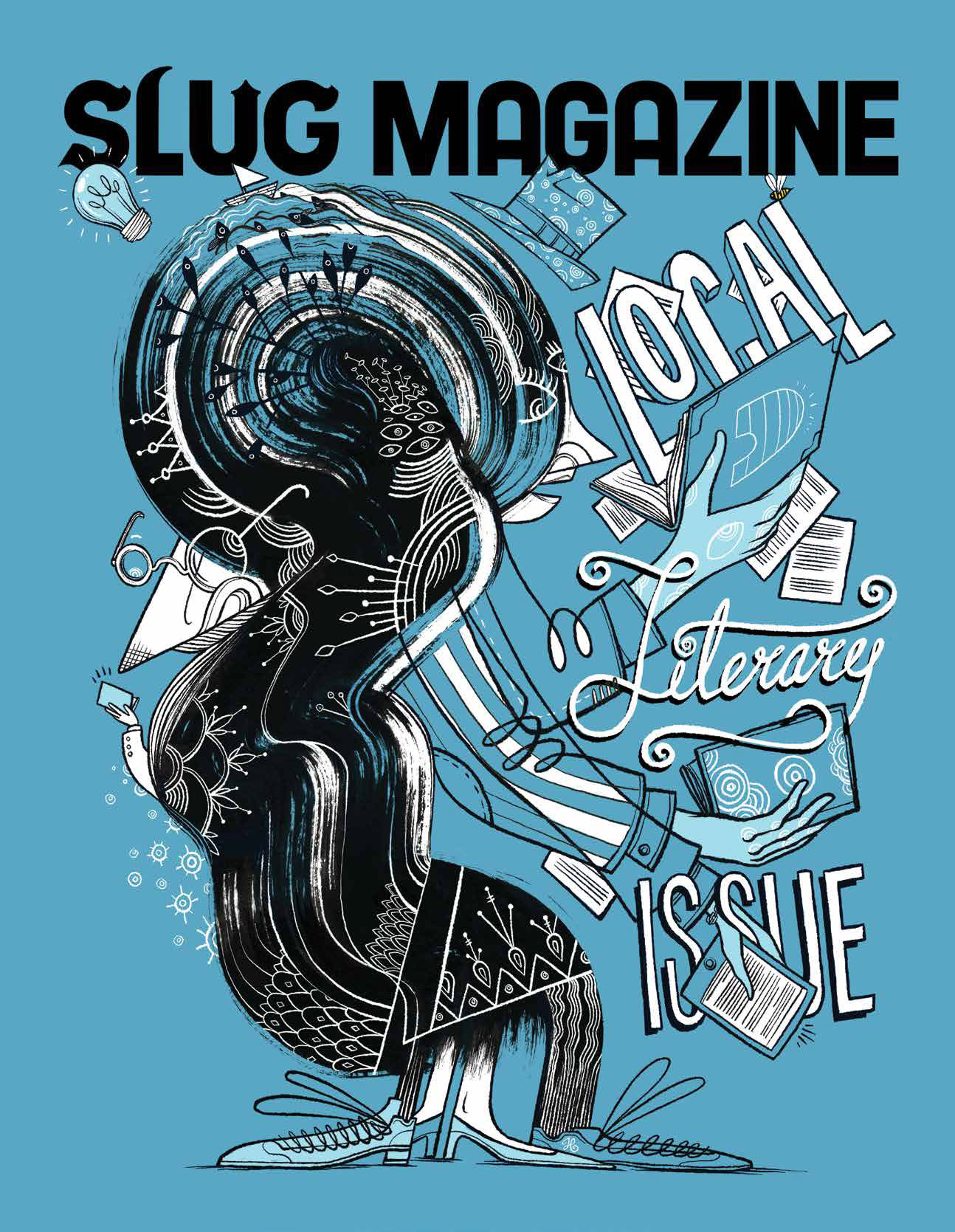
“For our second Local Literary Issue, David Habben (Habbenink) captures the physical, gestural and conceptual in-betweens of this figure’s act of reading—an imprint of how we assemble words in our psyches.”. Artist: David Habben (Habbenink)

SLUG has long provided coverage for local professional and amateur skateboarding in Utah, and their coverage of snowboarding and skiing began in 2001. Photo features of skateboarding and snowboarding/skiing appear in the print magazine. SLUG Magazine also organizes two action sports event series: SLUG Games and Summer of Death. SLUG has hosted a number of columns that have changed from year to year. A prominent column was the letter to the editor–style “Dear Dickheads,” which ran from 1989 to 2014. In addition to music, SLUG reviews movies/film, DVDs/TV series, products, books, comic books, zines, beer and video games.

== SLUG projects ==
The staff members of SLUG are avidly involved in the local underground scene of Salt Lake City. They can be found hosting local music showcases, producing skate and snowboard events and creating floats for the Utah Pride Parade.

SLUG also produces a local music compilation series, Death By Salt. In December 2007, SLUG released Death By Salt III, the first local compilation of its kind to be released on vinyl. In addition, SLUG hosts Localized, its own monthly showcase of local and upcoming artists. Over the years, SLUG organized two mainstay local music events each year: Sabbathon and its anniversary party. Sabbathon, a benefit concert featuring local bands, was held sporadically from 1989 to 2001 before being replaced by Localized. The SLUG Magazine anniversary party takes place every February. In July 2011, SLUG launched their own weekly podcast on iTunes titled Soundwaves From The Underground. An interview/variety program which features audio interviews and music both local and national, serving as an audio expansion of the magazine's coverage.
