= A Place For Owls =

Denver band

- Origin: Denver, Colorado
- Genres: Indie rock; emo; emo revival; Midwest emo
- Years active: 2019–present
- Label: Broom of Destruction Records
- Members: Ben Sooy; Nick Webber; Jesse Cowan; Ryan Day; Daniel Perez
- Website: aplaceforowls.com

A Place for Owls is an American indie rock and emo band from Denver, Colorado. The group is known for its emotive and narrative-driven lyrics, intersecting guitar arrangements, DIY ethos, and support of the emerging Denver emo scene. The band has released multiple independent recordings, and is active in Denver's indie music scene.

== History ==
A Place for Owls formed in Denver, Colorado, in 2019. The band began by playing local shows and writing and recording an acoustic-driven emo folk EP in 2020. In August 2022, A Place for Owls was featured by Colorado Public Radio's The Local 303 as an emerging Colorado band, noting their early singles and community roots in Denver's DIY music scene. The band released their first full-length album in August 2022. They continued to gain attention online and through regional touring, playing shows with Switchfoot, Mae, The Used, Foxing, and Unwed Sailor. The band played in and helped organized the Southwest Emo Fest and the Denver Emo Fest.

In 2024, the band released How We Dig in the Earth, a full-length album that expanded their sound with layered guitars, folk instrumentation, and more developed lyrical themes. The album was given favorable reviews by several independent music websites, including a 4.3 rating on sputnikmusic.com. In 2025, the band released a split LP with California's Birthday Dad, which was listed as a favorite new music release by Westword.

In 2026, the band announced the album All Thieves Vol.1, an international collaborative effort with several other DIY artists . Lead single "To Be Found" featured phoneswithchords, and July 3rd single, "Son of Man," featured Josaleigh Pollett.

The members of the band collaborated to form a nonprofit called Holy Fool, which connects musicians and patrons with the goal of providing encouragement, financial support, and mutual aid.

== Musical style ==
The band's music incorporates elements of indie rock, emo, midwest emo, and indie folk. Critics and listeners have compared their sound and influences to Manchester Orchestra, Foxing, Pedro The Lion, Sufjan Stevens, American Football, Jimmy Eat World, and early Death Cab for Cutie. Their lyrics often explore themes such as friendship, grief, faith, and community.

The group frequently uses interlocking guitar parts and layered dual-vocal harmonies. They are known for their unique integration of folk instruments (trumpet, saxophone, and banjo) into their indie rock sound.

== Band members ==
- Ben Sooy – vocals, guitar
- Nick Webber – guitar, sax, piano
- Jesse Cowan – drums
- Ryan Day – bass
- Daniel Perez – lead guitar, vocals

== Discography ==
=== Studio albums ===
- Self Titled (2022)
- How We Dig in the Earth (2024)

=== EPs, splits and singles ===
- "You Are Still in Every Song I Sing" (2020)
- "Airport" / "My Own" (2022)
- "Celebration Guns" / "A Place for Owls" (2023)
- "Pt. 2" (2024)
- "My Friends Were Here" / "Birthday Dad" (2025)
- "Son of Man" featuring Josaleigh Pollett (2026)
