= Heatmap News =

American climate journalism website

- Editor in chief: Nico Lauricella
- Executive editor: Robinson Meyer
- Format: Digital
- Founded: 2023
- Country: United States

Heatmap News is an American digital media company focusing on climate journalism. Founded in 2023, Heatmap takes a solutions-oriented approach to the climate crisis, covering its intersections with politics, business, and culture.

== History ==
Heatmap was founded by a group of former executives at The Week, including former editor-in-chief Nico Lauricella, former CEO Sara O'Connor, and Randy Seigel, the former CEO of the magazine's publisher. Robinson Meyer, a staff writer at The Atlantic, was hired as executive editor, and several climate-focused journalists came on as contributors. The site launched in March 2023. Lauricella, who became Heatmap's editor in chief, compared the outlet's launch to the early days of Wired, describing its focus on covering climate “as the all-encompassing epic it is.”

The company focused initially on consumer subscriptions, implementing a metered paywall that allowed readers to access some content while encouraging them to pay for full access. As of March 2024, it had about 500,000 monthly readers and more than 50,000 newsletter subscribers, employing 12 full-time reporters.

== Coverage ==
Meyer's first piece for Heatmap described an era of "climate post-science" in which environmental scientists combine a focus on the Earth with attention to how "humanity itself" is affected. In its first year, the site broke stories relating to electric vehicle rollouts, the implementation of the Inflation Reduction Act, and U.S. hydrogen policy.

In 2025, Heatmap won its first National Magazine Award, honored in the service journalism category for the "Decarbonize Your Life" special report edited by Jillian Goodman.

Heatmap does not accept advertising from fossil fuel companies, a split from legacy media organizations that run such content alongside their climate coverage.
