= 1970 Israel Super Cup =

Maccabi Tel Aviv	Hapoel Tel Aviv
1	2
- Date: 20 October 1970
- Venue: Bloomfield Stadium, Tel Aviv
- Referee: Shmuel Handwerg
- Attendance: 10,000

The 1970 Israel Super Cup was the second Israel Super Cup (seventh, including unofficial matches, as the competition wasn't played within the Israel Football Association in its first 5 editions, until 1969), an annual Israeli football match played between the winners of the previous season's Top Division and Israel State Cup.

The match was played between Maccabi Tel Aviv, champions of the 1969–70 Liga Leumit and Hapoel Tel Aviv, runners-up in the league, as Maccabi Tel Aviv also won the 1969–70 Israel State Cup. Since Maccabi Tel Aviv won the previous season's double, the cup was officially designated as "The Liga Leumit Cup".

The match was due to be played on 14 October 1970, but was postponed due to weather conditions, and was held a week later. At the match, played at Bloomfield Stadium, Hapoel Tel Aviv won 2–1.

== Match details ==
20 October 1970

Maccabi Tel Aviv	1–2	Hapoel Tel Aviv
Nimni 58'		Salim 26'; Chazom 47'

Bloomfield Stadium, Tel Aviv
Attendance: 10,000
Referee: Shmuel Handwerg

Maccabi Tel Aviv	Hapoel Tel Aviv

GK	(Israel) Shimshon Levkovich
RB	(Israel) Avraham Shtamberg
CB	(Israel) Michael Gershovitz
CB	(Israel) Yehuda Linker
LB	(Israel) Menachem Bello
CM	(Israel) Ya'akov Yashvinski
CM	(Israel) Moshe Asis (c)
CM	(Israel) Meir Nimni
FW	(Israel) Zvi Heimann
FW	(Israel) Dror Bar-Nur
FW	(Israel) Ezra Ozeri
Substitutes:
MF	(Israel) Roni Luria	Substituted on
MF	(Israel) Yehuda Gargir	Substituted on
MF	(Israel) Yaron Oz	Substituted on
Manager:
Israel Halivner

GK	(Israel) Avraham Binyamin
RB	(Israel) Shimon Ben Yehonatan (c)
DF	(Israel) Ya'akov Rahminovich
DF	(Israel) Nahman Castro
LB	(Israel) Brener
CM	(Israel) Shabi Ben Baruch
CM	(Israel) Ami Admoni
CM	(Israel) Yehezkel Chazom
FW	(Israel) David Salim
FW	(Israel) Yehoshua Feigenbaum
FW	(Israel) George Borba
Substitutes:
MF	(Israel) Eli Bachar	Substituted on
FW	(Israel) Yehoshua Amarillio	Substituted on
Manager:
(Israel) Rehavia Rosenbaum
