= 1977 Israel Super Cup =

Maccabi Tel Aviv	Maccabi Jaffa
3	2
- Date: 1 October 1977
- Venue: Bloomfield Stadium, Tel Aviv
- Referee: Avraham Klein
- Attendance: 8,000

The 1977 Israel Super Cup was the seventh Israel Super Cup (12th, including unofficial matches, as the competition wasn't played within the Israel Football Association in its first 5 editions, until 1969), an annual Israel football match played between the winners of the previous season's Top Division and Israel State Cup.

The match was played between Maccabi Tel Aviv, champions of the 1976–77 Liga Leumit and Maccabi Jaffa, runners-up in the league, as Maccabi Tel Aviv also won the 1976–77 Israel State Cup.

This was Maccabi Tel Aviv's 4th Israel Super Cup appearance (including unofficial matches) and Maccabi Jaffa's first. At the match, played at Bloomfield Stadium, Maccabi Tel Aviv won 3–2.

== Match details ==
1 October 1977
14:30

Maccabi Tel Aviv	3–2	Maccabi Jaffa
Peretz 46'; Moshe Leon 49' (o.g.); Oz 64'		Trabes 27'; Onana 29'

Bloomfield Stadium, Tel Aviv
Attendance: 8,000
Referee: Avraham Klein

Maccabi Tel Aviv	Maccabi Jaffa

GK	(Israel) Yosef Surinov
RB	(Israel) Alon Kaplan
CB	(Israel) Yehuda Linker
LB	(Israel) Menachem Bello (c)
CB	(Israel) Avi Yerushalmi
CM	(Israel) Moshe Schweitzer	Substituted off
CM	(Israel) Yaron Oz
CM	(Israel) Yehuda Gargir
FW	(Israel) Mizrahi
FW	(Israel) Vicky Peretz
FW	(Israel) Beni Tabak
Substitutes:
MF	(Israel) Avraham Levy	Substituted in
Manager:
(Israel) Shmulik Perlman

GK	(Israel) Herzel Kabilio
RB	(Israel) Yosef Sadrina
DF	(Israel) Moshe Leon
DF	(Israel) Meshulam Silberstein	Substituted off
LB	Israel Daniel
CM	(Israel) Eli Schechter
CM	(Israel) Albert Levy
CM	(Israel) Shimon Look	Substituted off
FW	(Israel) Avraham Aroeti
FW	(Israel) Moshe Onana
FW	(Israel) Shmuel Trabes
Substitutes:
DF	(Israel) Moni Ninio	Substituted in
MF	Israel Shokian	Substituted in
Manager:
(Israel) Shmuel Levy
