= 1979 Israel Super Cup =

Maccabi Tel Aviv	Beitar Jerusalem
2	0
- Date: 1 September 1979
- Venue: Bloomfield Stadium, Tel Aviv
- Referee: Avraham Klein
- Attendance: 10,000

The 1979 Israel Super Cup was the ninth Israel Super Cup (14th, including unofficial matches, as the competition wasn't played within the Israel Football Association in its first 5 editions, until 1969), an annual Israel football match played between the winners of the previous season's Top Division and Israel State Cup.

The match was played between Maccabi Tel Aviv, champions of the 1978–79 Liga Leumit and Beitar Jerusalem, winners of the 1978–79 Israel State Cup.

This was Maccabi Tel Aviv's 5th Israel Super Cup appearance (including unofficial matches) and Beitar's third. At the match, played at Bloomfield Stadium, Maccabi Tel Aviv won 2–0.

== Match details ==
1 September 1979

Maccabi Tel Aviv	2–0	Beitar Jerusalem
Kaplan 2'; Schweitzer 25' (pen.)

Bloomfield Stadium, Tel Aviv
Attendance: 10,000
Referee: Avraham Klein

Maccabi Tel Aviv	Beitar Jerusalem

GK	(Israel) Emmanuel Schwarz
RB	(Israel) Rami Marciano
CB	(Israel) Meir Nimni
CB	(Israel) Avi Yerushalmi
LB	(Israel) Menachem Bello (c)
CM	(Israel) Yehuda Katsav
CM	(Israel) Yaron Oz
CM	(Israel) Alon Kaplan	Substituted off
FW	(Israel) Beni Tabak
FW	(Israel) Moshe Schweitzer	(substituted off) 45'
FW	(Israel) Vicky Peretz
Substitutes:
MF	(Israel) Avraham Levy	Substituted in
FW	(Israel) Moshe Goldenberg	(substituted in) 45'
Manager:
(Israel) Nissim Bachar

GK	(Israel) Yossi Mizrahi
RB	(Israel) Yossi Hacham		Substituted off
DF	(Israel) Itzhak Jano
DF	(Israel) Hanan Azulay (c)
LB	(Israel) Moshe Golan
RM	(Israel) Yigal Gruber
CM	(Israel) Moshe Cohen (footballer)
CM	(Israel) Danny Noyman
LM	(Israel) David Yishai		Substituted off
FW	(Israel) Eli Miali
FW	(Israel) Yossi Avrahami
Substitutes:
DF	(Israel) Mordechai Levy		Substituted in
MF	(Israel) Maman	Booked	Substituted in
Manager:
(Israel) Emmanuel Scheffer
