= 1991–92 Toto Cup Leumit =

Toto Cup Leumit
- Season: 1991–92
- Champions: Bnei Yehuda

The 1991–92 Toto Cup Leumit was the eighth season of the third most important football tournament in Israel since its introduction.

It was held in two stages. First, the twelve Liga Leumit teams, along with four Liga Artzit teams were divided into four groups. The group winners advanced to the semi-finals, which, as was the final, were held as one-legged matches.

The competition began on 7 September 1991 and ended on 28 January 1992, with Bnei Yehuda beating Maccabi Tel Aviv 2–1 in the final.

== Group stage ==
The matches were played from 7 September to 28 December 1991.

=== Group A ===
Pos	Team	Pld	W	D	L	GF	GA	GD	Pts	MTA	HTZ	BEI	MHA
1	Maccabi Tel Aviv (A)	6	5	0	1	11	1	+10	15	—	1–0	4–0	1–0
2	Hapoel Tzafririm Holon	6	2	2	2	7	6	+1	8	0–3	—	1–0	5–1
3	Beitar Jerusalem	6	2	1	3	6	10	−4	7	0–2	0–0	—	3–1
4	Maccabi Haifa	6	1	1	4	6	13	−7	4	1–0	1–1	2–3	—

Source: Fifth Round Tables hpt.co.il (in Hebrew); Maccabi Tel Aviv (in Hebrew); Maccabi Haifa (in Hebrew)
Rules for classification: 1st points; 2nd goal difference; 3rd matches won; 4th goals scored; 5th head-to-head; 6th decision match
(A) Advanced to semifinal

=== Group B ===
Pos	Team	Pld	W	D	L	GF	GA	GD	Pts	HPT	HBS	HKS	HJE
1	Hapoel Petah Tikva (A)	6	3	3	0	10	6	+4	12	—	3–3	0–1	1–0
2	Hapoel Be'er Sheva	6	2	4	0	14	7	+7	10	2–2	—	3–1	
3	Hapoel Kfar Saba	6	2	1	3	4	7	−3	7	0–2	0–0	—	2–1
4	Hapoel Jerusalem	6	0	2	4	3	11	−8	2	1–1		0–1	—

Source: hpt.co.il (in Hebrew); hpt.co.il (in Hebrew); Hapoel Kfar Saba (in Hebrew)
Rules for classification: 1st points; 2nd goal difference; 3rd matches won; 4th goals scored; 5th head-to-head; 6th decision match
(A) Advanced to semifinal

=== Group C ===
Pos	Team	Pld	W	D	L	GF	GA	GD	Pts	HTA	BTA	MPT	HRG
1	Hapoel Tel Aviv (A)	6	4	1	1	8	3	+5	13	—	2–0	0–0	1–0
2	Beitar Tel Aviv	6	3	0	3	20	10	+10	9	1–3	—		
3	Maccabi Petah Tikva	6	2	2	2	10	15	−5	8	1–0		—	
4	Hapoel Ramat Gan	6	1	1	4	7	17	−10	4	1–2			—

Source: Red Fans Wiki (in Hebrew)
Rules for classification: 1st points; 2nd goal difference; 3rd matches won; 4th goals scored; 5th head-to-head; 6th decision match
(A) Advanced to semifinal

=== Group D ===
Pos	Team	Pld	W	D	L	GF	GA	GD	Pts	BnY	MYA	MIA	MNE
1	Bnei Yehuda (A)	6	5	1	0	15	5	+10	16	—	2–0	4–1	2–2
2	Maccabi Yavne	6	1	3	2	10	10	0	6	2–4	—		
3	Maccabi Ironi Ashdod	6	1	3	2	9	12	−3	6	0–1		—	
4	Maccabi Netanya	6	0	3	3	5	12	−7	3	0–2			—

Source: Bnei Yehuda Museum (in Hebrew)
Rules for classification: 1st points; 2nd goal difference; 3rd matches won; 4th goals scored; 5th head-to-head; 6th decision match
(A) Advanced to semifinal

== Elimination rounds ==
=== Semifinals ===
21 January 1992	Bnei Yehuda	1–0	Hapoel Petah Tikva	Tel Aviv
	Ivanir 68' (pen.)	Report (in Hebrew)		Stadium: Bloomfield Stadium; Attendance: 7000; Referee: Sabi Elnekaveh

21 January 1992	Maccabi Tel Aviv	1–0	Hapoel Tel Aviv	Tel Aviv
	Shriki 23'	Report (in Hebrew)		Stadium: Bloomfield Stadium; Attendance: 12,000; Referee: Ya'akov Ben Hemo

=== Final ===
28 January 1992

Bnei Yehuda	2–1	Maccabi Tel Aviv
Revivo 36' (pen.); Alpia 71'	Report (in Hebrew)	Nimni 90'

Bloomfield Stadium
Attendance: 7,000
Referee: Haim Lipkovich

== See also ==
- 1991–92 Toto Cup Artzit
