= 1988 Israel Super Cup =

Hapoel Tel Aviv	Maccabi Tel Aviv
0	3
- Date: 5 September 1988
- Venue: Bloomfield Stadium, Tel Aviv

The 1988 Israel Super Cup was the 17th Israel Super Cup (22nd, including unofficial matches, as the competition wasn't played within the Israel Football Association in its first 5 editions, until 1969), an annual Israel football match played between the winners of the previous season's Top Division and Israel State Cup.

The match was played between Hapoel Tel Aviv, champions of the 1987–88 Liga Leumit and Maccabi Tel Aviv, winners of the 1987–88 Israel State Cup.

This was Hapoel's 8th Israel Super Cup appearance and Maccabi's 5th (both including unofficial matches). Hapoel fielded a weakened team, as most senior players refused to play since the management didn't pay the players' salaries over the previous season. Maccabi, therefore, won the match 3–0.

== Match details ==
5 September 1988

Hapoel Tel Aviv	0–3	Maccabi Tel Aviv
		Cohen 43'; Natan 45'; Tabak 47'

Bloomfield Stadium, Tel Aviv
