= Ivanir =

Ivanir (Hebrew: איוניר) is a Jewish surname. Notable people with the surname include:

- Mark Ivanir (born 1968), Ukrainian-born Israeli actor
- Motti Ivanir (born 1964), Israeli footballer and manager
