= Gadi Brumer =

Israeli footballer

Personal information
- Date of birth: 5 November 1973 (age 52)
- Place of birth: Johannesburg, South Africa
- Position: Sweeper

Youth career
- Maccabi Tel Aviv

Senior career*
Years	Team	Apps	(Gls)
1991–2004	Maccabi Tel Aviv	316	(7)

International career
1990	Israel U17	1	(0)
1992–1995	Israel U21	23	(0)
1993–2002	Israel	24	(2)

Managerial career
- 2005–2006: Maccabi Tel Aviv (assistant manager)
- 2007–2009: Maccabi Kokhav Ya'ir
- 2009–2010: Hapoel Hod HaSharon
- 2010: Maccabi Kokhav Ya'ir
- 2010–2012: Hapoel Hod HaSharon
- 2012–2013: Beitar Tubruk
- 2015–2016: Maccabi Tel Aviv (U-16)
- * Club domestic league appearances and goals

Gadi Brumer (Hebrew: גדי ברומר; born 5 November 1973) is a former Israeli professional footballer who played for Maccabi Tel Aviv.

== Career ==
Brumer (who played at centre-back and sweeper positions), is notable for playing his entire career for Maccabi Tel Aviv (see List of one-club men), and was famous not only for his intelligence in defence, but also for his fighting spirit and his commitment, having often played whilst injured.

Brumer was summoned to a trial with Manchester United in June 1996, thus becoming the first and only Israeli to be on trial with the club. Though he was good in the trial, Manchester preferred Norwegian Ronny Johnsen. Brumer was offered contracts from other teams in the Premier League, but decided to hold out for a big club which never happened and Brumer continued with his home club.

== Honours ==
- Israeli championships (3):
  - 1994–95, 1995–96, 2002–03
- Israel State Cup (4):
  - 1994, 1996, 2001, 2002
- Toto Cup (1):
  - 1998–99

== Personal life ==
Gadi's twin brother Alon was a midfielder and both played together in Maccabi Tel Aviv for 9 seasons.
