= Alon Brumer =

Israeli former professional footballer

Personal information
- Date of birth: 5 November 1973 (age 52)
- Place of birth: Johannesburg, South Africa
- Position: Midfielder

Team information
- Current team: Hapoel Hod HaSharon

Youth career
- Maccabi Tel Aviv

Senior career*
Years	Team	Apps	(Gls)
1990–1999	Maccabi Tel Aviv	108	(7)
1999–2000	Hapoel Ironi Rishon LeZion	39	(5)
2000–2001	Maccabi Tel Aviv		

International career
1993–1995	Israel U21	15	(0)
1995–1996	Israel	2	(0)

Managerial career
- 2007–2009: Maccabi Kokhav Ya'ir
- 2010–2013: Hapoel Hod HaSharon
- 2015–: Hapoel Hod HaSharon
- * Club domestic league appearances and goals

Alon Brumer (Hebrew: אלון ברומר; born 5 November 1973) is an Israeli former professional footballer who played for Maccabi Tel Aviv and Hapoel Ironi Rishon LeZion.

Brumer now works as the manager of Hapoel Hod HaSharon.

== Honours ==
- Israeli Premier League (2):
  - 1994–95, 1995–96
- Israel State Cup (2):
  - 1994, 1996

== Personal life ==
Alon's twin brother Gadi was a defender; the two played together at Maccabi Tel Aviv for nine seasons.
