= Maccabi Tel Aviv F.C. =

Israeli football club

Maccabi Tel Aviv
- Full name: Maccabi Tel Aviv Football Club
- Nicknames: Maccabi; The Yellows; Maccabi Fanatics
- Short name: MTA
- Founded: 1906; 120 years ago
- Ground: Bloomfield Stadium, Tel Aviv, Israel
- Capacity: 29,400
- Owner: Mitchell Goldhar
- Chairman: Jack Angelides
- Coach: Kenny Miller
- League: Israeli Premier League
- 2025–26: Israeli Premier League, 3rd of 14
- Website: www.maccabi-tlv.co.il/en
Home colours	Away colours	Third colours

Maccabi Tel Aviv Football Club (Hebrew: מועדון כדורגל מכבי תל אביב; Moadon Kaduregel Maccabi Tel Aviv) is an Israeli professional football club from Tel Aviv and part of the Maccabi Tel Aviv Sport Club.

Founded in 1906 in Jaffa as the HaRishon Le Zion-Yafo Association, it is the oldest football club in Israel. With the establishment of the city of Tel Aviv in 1909, the club changed its name to Maccabi Tel Aviv. In 1922, it became the first Jewish football club to participate in local competitions. The meaning of the name Maccabi forms an integral part of the character of the team, which took the Star of David as their logo to represent the Jewish people. Maccabi Tel Aviv have won more titles than any other Israeli club, winning 26 League Championships, 24 State Cups, 8 Toto (League) Cups, and 2 Asian Champion Club Tournaments before Israel were expelled from the AFC in 1974.

Maccabi Tel Aviv is the only football team that has never been relegated from the Israeli Premier League, the only Israeli club to have achieved a domestic treble, and one of only three Israeli teams ever to progress to the UEFA Champions League group stage. The club is named after the Maccabees and invests in the development and nurturing of young talent: the club runs three football academies in the Tel Aviv area as part of its youth programme, working with over 750 children aged 6–15, as well as running 17 youth teams with 400 players between 9 and 19 years old. These teams tend to compete very successfully in local and national leagues.

== History ==
A chart showing the progress of Maccabi Tel Aviv through the Israeli football league system, from the first season in 1931–32 to the present

=== Before 1950 ===
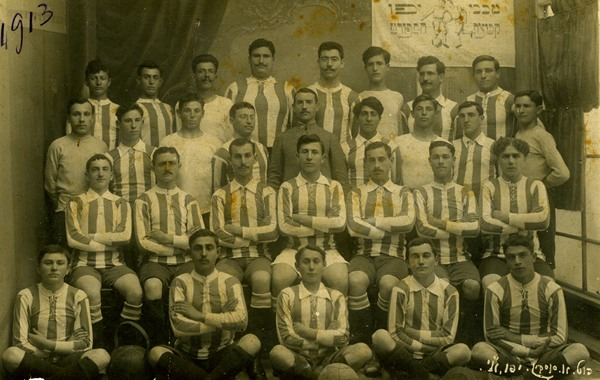
Maccabi Tel Aviv, 1913

In the early 1920s, despite the absence of an organised league, Maccabi Tel Aviv were known as the strongest football team in Palestine and were invited to numerous friendly matches, even against British teams of the local Mandate. Official tournaments began taking place in 1928 with the establishment of the Football Association and FIFA's recognition of Israeli football. In 1929, the team won their first trophy after beating Maccabi Jerusalem F.C. 4–0. Maccabi took the championship again one year later with a 2–1 victory over the British Army's 48th regiment and a third time in 1933, when Hapoel Tel Aviv were beaten, 1–0.

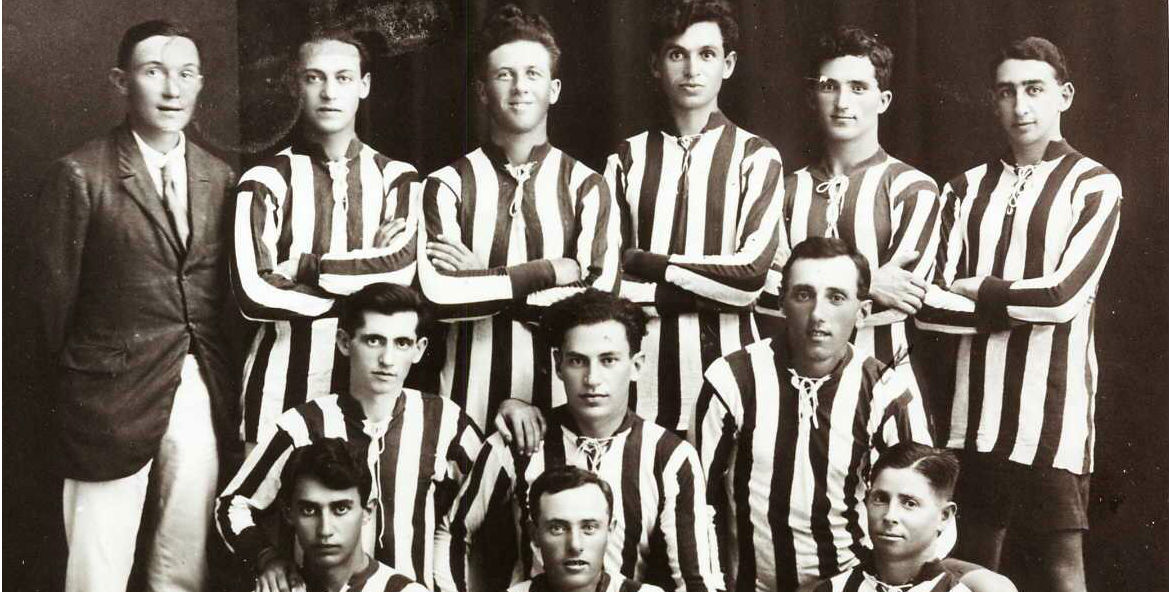
Maccabi Tel Aviv, 1921

In 1936, the club was invited to play in the United States. On their way there, Maccabi played in France, losing 2–0 to Racing Paris and 3–1 to Lille. In the United States, Maccabi defeated the All-star team of New York City in front of 50,000 in Yankee Stadium. Maccabi also defeated the American Soccer League team in Brooklyn and Philadelphia on their home ground 1–0 and also played in Canada, where they drew 1–1 with Toronto All-Stars. Maccabi continued their tour in the US and lost, 3–2, to St. Louis Stars and the Boston Celtics.

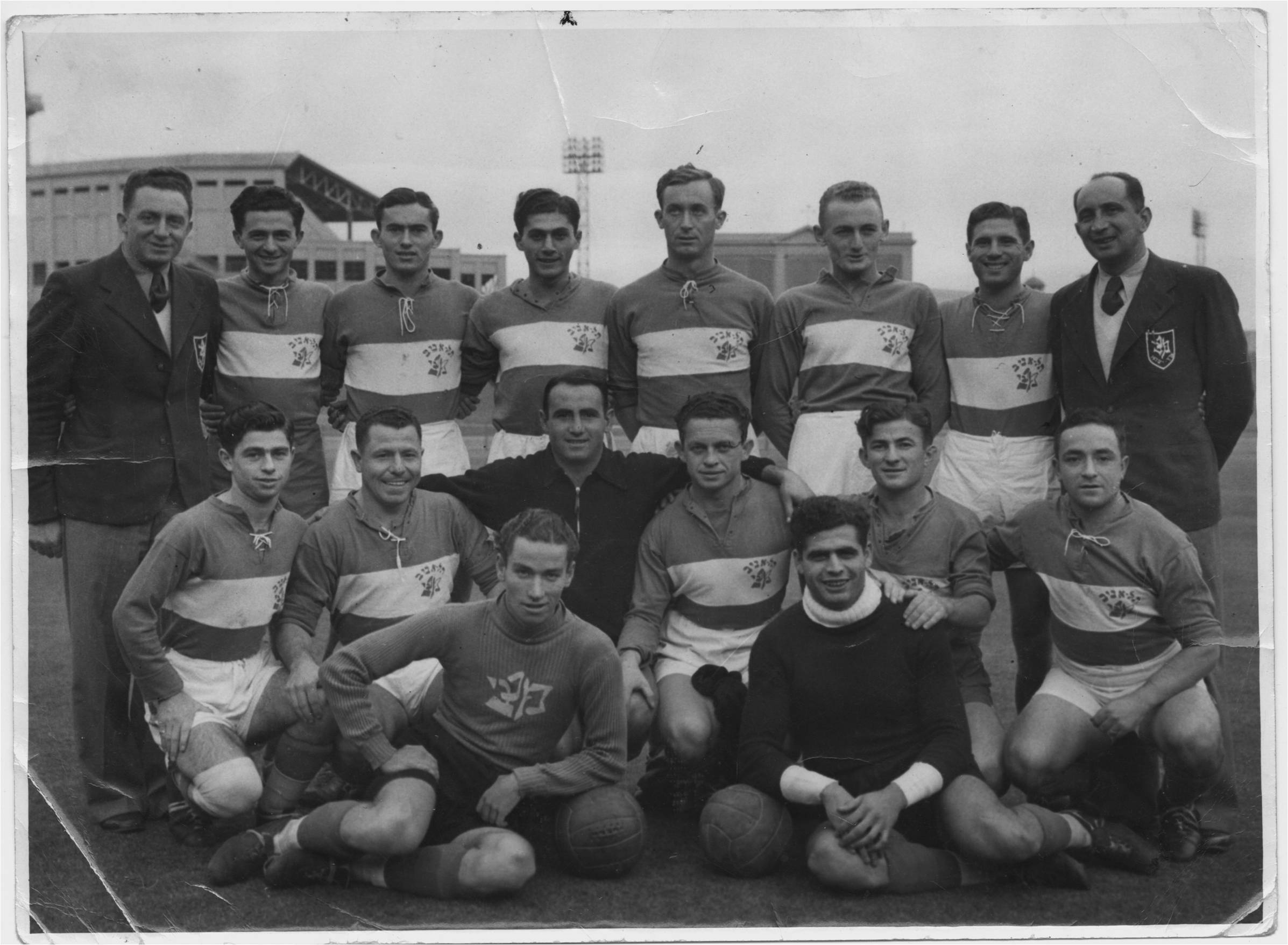
Maccabi Tel Aviv in Australia, 1939

After returning from the United States, Maccabi players went on strike because they had not been paid. In 1937, after a year of strike action, the Football Association accepted their demands and the team ended their strike. In that year, Maccabi Tel Aviv also won their first league title. In 1939, after the start of World War II, Maccabi won their second championship. At the end of the season, Maccabi went to another tour, this time to Australia where they were known as the "Palestine" team and occasionally the Maccabi Palestine team. They played 18 games, winning 11, losing 5 and drawing 2. The games were against State sides (New South Wales, Victoria, Queensland, South Australia and Western Australia), regional sides and five "tests" against the Australian national team, winning one, drawing one and losing three.

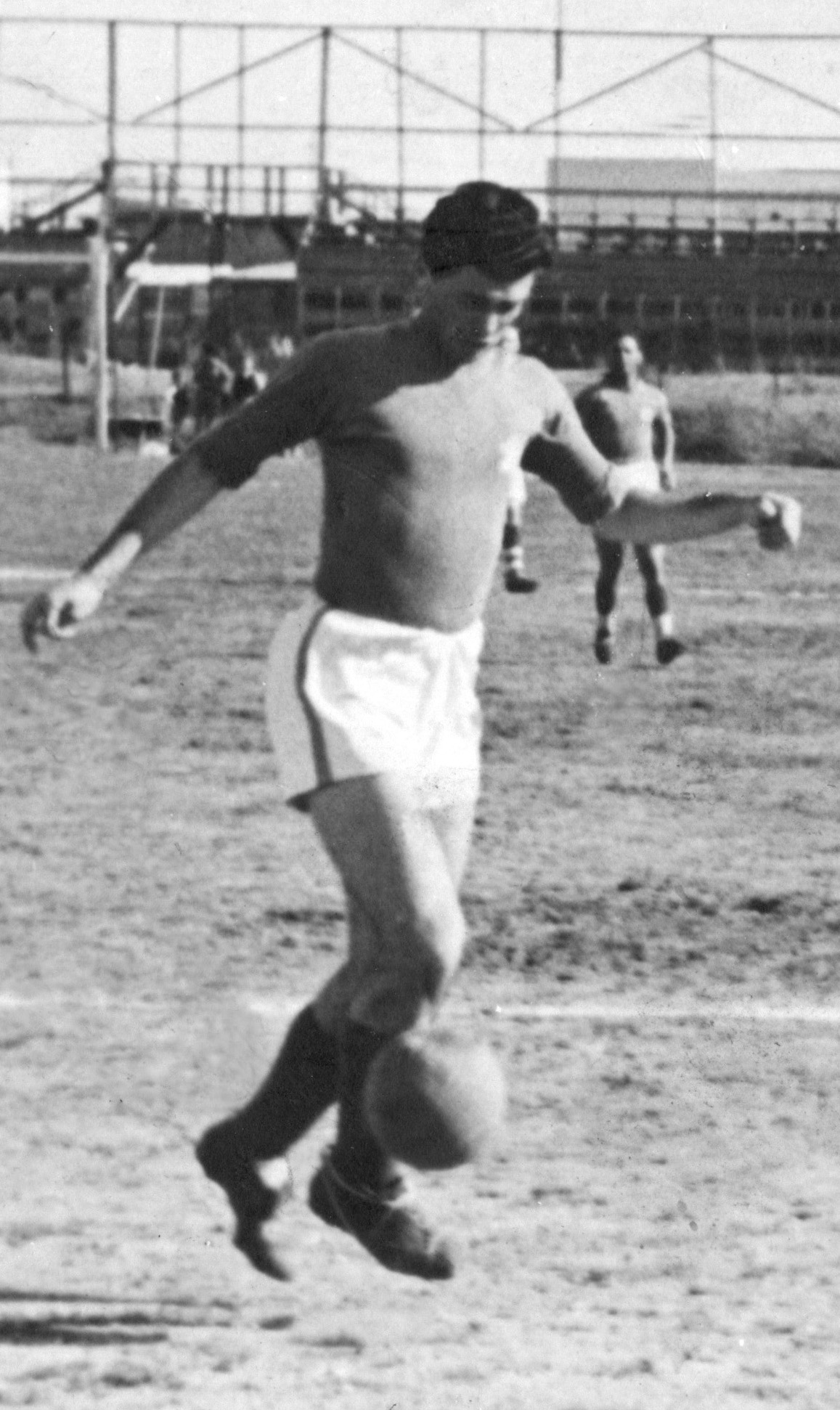
Shmuel Ginzburg played for Maccabi Tel Aviv from 1936 to 1943 and contributed to the team's cup win in 1941.

In 1941 Maccabi won their first "double", Winning both the league and State Cup, beating Hapoel Tel Aviv, 2–1, in the final. Between 1941 and 1945, the league was suspended because of the war, but Maccabi continued playing friendly matches. In 1946, the league was still suspended but the State Cup returned with Maccabi beating Hapoel Rishon LeZion 6–0 on aggregate in the final. In 1947, the league resumed and Maccabi won it as well as reaching the cup final. In the match against Beitar Tel Aviv at the Hatikva Neighborhood Stadium Maccabi were winning 3–2 when the referee disallowed a goal by Beitar. The Beitar players and their supporters stormed at the referee and Beitar defender Yom-Tov Mansherov broke the Cup. As a result, the referee ended the game and Maccabi were awarded a technical victory, thus winning a second double. Forty-five years later the cup was found in Petah Tikva.

=== 1950s ===
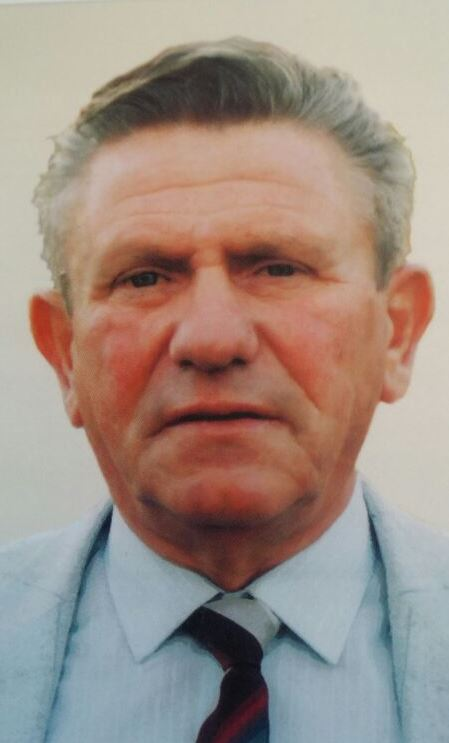
Itzhak Schneor

This decade is considered Maccabi Tel Aviv's "Golden Age", in which they won five championships and four Israel Football Association Cups. The "Golden Age" actually began with the establishment of the State of Israel, with Maccabi Tel Aviv winning the league title in the 1949–50 season. The deciding match of the season was the second Tel Aviv derby against Hapoel Tel Aviv, which Maccabi won, 1–0, thanks to a goal from striker Yosef "Yosale" Merimovich that sealed Maccabi Tel Aviv's first post-colonisation championship title. Merimovich was just one member of a squad of outstanding players that left Maccabi Tel Aviv unchallenged in their domination of the Israeli Premier League during the 1950s. That squad included the likes of defenders Itzhak Schneor and Eli Fuchs, goalkeeper Avraham Bandouri, striker Zvi Studinski and of course the club's legendary centre forward Yehoshua "Shiye" Glazer. Glazer, who won the top scorer title in 1952 with 27 goals, is considered Maccabi Tel Aviv's greatest ever striker and was the club's highest goal scorer until Avi Nimni broke his record in 2003.

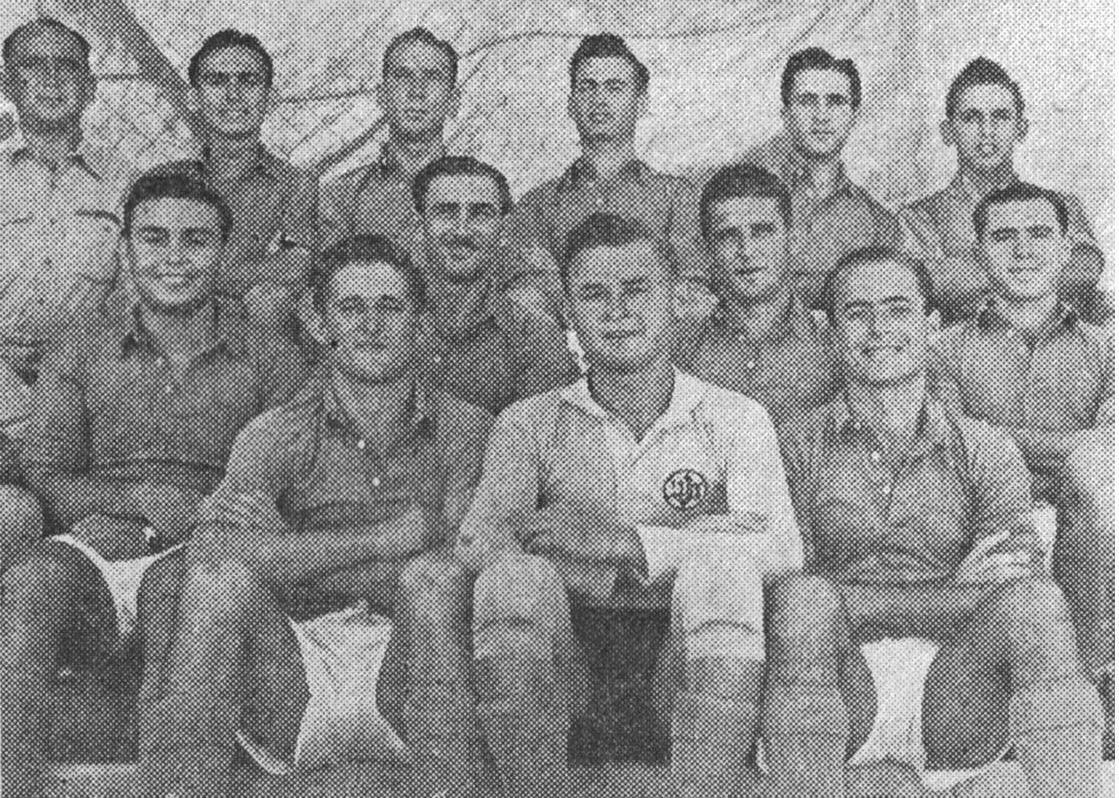
Maccabi team after winning the 1946 State Cup

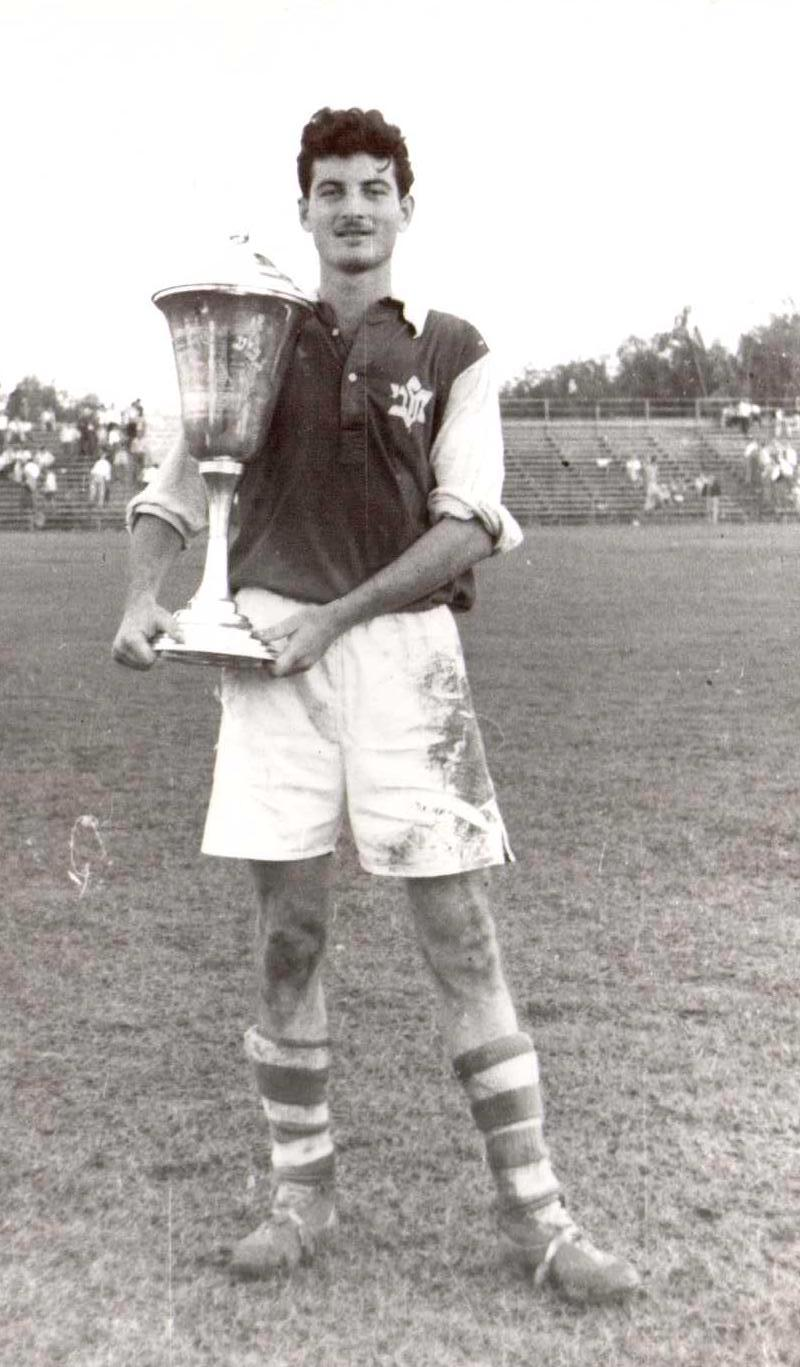
Noach Reznik with the State Cup, 1957

The 1951–52 season was Maccabi's second league title after the establishment of the State, which they won by eight points ahead of Maccabi Petah Tikva, though they lost the IFA Cup final. That loss only inspired them to win an historic first double in the 1953–54 season, once again winning the league ahead of Maccabi Petah Tikva. That year's Cup final provided them with the opportunity to put in one of their most devastating performances, crushing their opponents Maccabi Netanya 4–0 with a brace from Glazer and individual goals from Studinski and midfielder Israel Halivner.

It was the following season that the great Hapoel Petah Tikva team of midfielder Nahum Stelmach and associates burst on the scene and captured the championship from Maccabi Tel Aviv after a down to the wire finish. Still, Maccabi Tel Aviv weren't prepared to surrender all the titles that season and came up trumps in a 3–1 victory over the same Hapoel Petah Tikva in the IFA Cup final. Maccabi went on to beat them to the title in two more seasons, 1955–56 and 1957–58, completing their fifth National Championship in the first decade of the modern state of Israel. That final season title was complemented by a double, with Maccabi beating Hapoel Haifa in the IFA Cup final, 2–0.

The following season Maccabi Tel Aviv won their second consecutive IFA Cup in a final that will be remembered as notable in the entire history of the competition. Maccabi appeared to be headed to victory with a 4–0 lead just ten minutes from time. But within five of those final ten minutes Hapoel Petah Tikva pulled back three of those goals, creating one of the most exciting finales in IFA Cup history. But in the end Maccabi held on to celebrate yet another IFA Cup triumph.

=== 1960s ===
Maccabi Tel Aviv's original logo

Following the "Golden Years" of the 1950s, Maccabi Tel Aviv found themselves as the new decade began challenged and ultimately eclipsed by the emergent HaPoel Petach Tikva, who during the late 1950s and early 1960s won five consecutive league titles. The second of those championships, in 1960, came at Maccabi's expense, with the Yellows leading the table on the last day of the season only to disappointingly lose their final match to Hapoel Haifa thereby handing the championship to Hapoel Petah Tikva. The outstanding player of Maccabi's season had been Rafi Levi, one of the greatest strikers in the club's history, who was the league's leading goal scorer with 19 goals. A year later the Brazilian club Santos visited Israel, along with their legendary player, Pelé, for a friendly match against a side composed of the best players from both Maccabi Tel Aviv and Hapoel Petah Tikva. But even the combined forces of the two best clubs in the country were no match for the Brazilians, who won, 3–1.

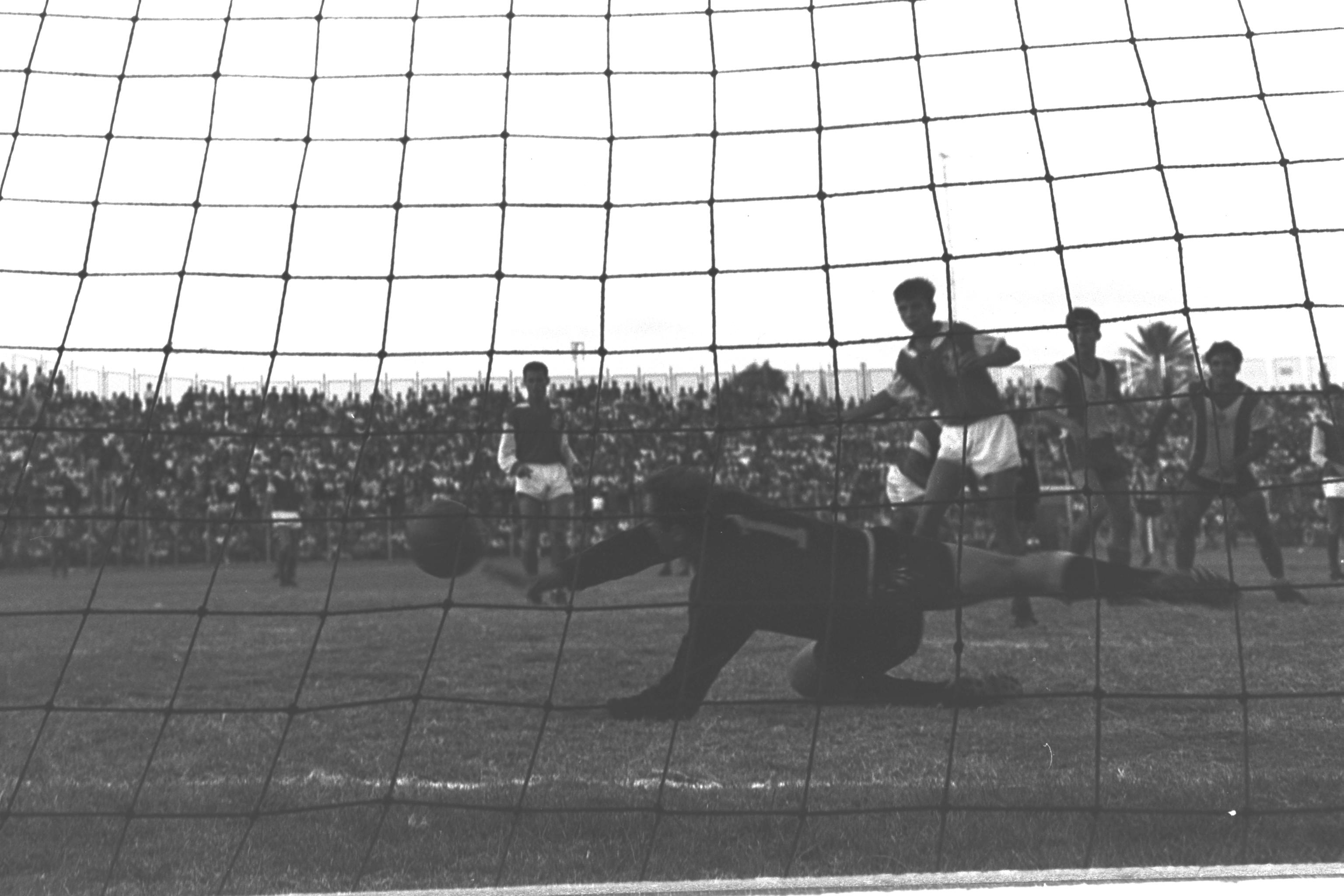
State Cup final, 1964, Bloomfield Stadium

After a number of unremarkable seasons, the 1960s saw the return of Maccabi Tel Aviv with one of their greatest coaches, Jerry Beit haLevi. He had served the club as a player in the 1930s and, with the exception of one year, managed the club for the 10 years between 1947 and 1957. Under his guardianship Maccabi Tel Aviv slowly returned to form and in the 1963–64 season won the Israel Football Association Cup after a second replay against Hapoel Haifa, which Maccabi won, 2–1. The following season Maccabi Tel Aviv repeated the feat by exactly the same score, this time in a dramatic extra time victory over Bnei Yehuda that included goals by midfielders Moshe Asis and Rafi Baranes. In the 1966–67 season Maccabi added a third IFA Cup. This time the opponent in the final were city rivals Hapoel Tel Aviv whom Maccabi defeated by the very same 2–1 score line, with goals from midfielder Uri Kedmi and striker Rachamim Talbi.

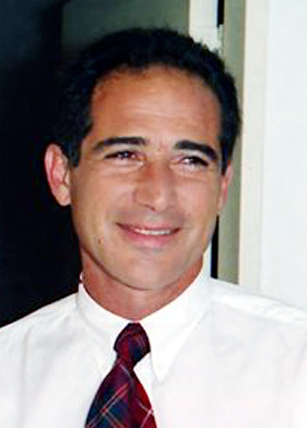
Giora Spiegel, played for the club in the years 1965–1973

While the Cup competition was held as scheduled that year, the league was interrupted by the Six-Day War and was extended into 1968. Now coached by their former midfielder Israel Halivner, Maccabi Tel Aviv won their first and only championship of the decade after a combined 60 match weeks, leading Hapoel Petah Tikva by three points at the top of the Israel Premier League table. But by far the most memorable event of the decade was Maccabi's success in the Asian Champion Club Tournament in 1969, becoming the second Israeli football club to win an international competition in the country's history. Now managed by former striking great Yossele Merimovich, Maccabi beat South Korean side Yangzee FC in extra time through a goal by striker Dror Bar Nur.

A less successful decade for Maccabi Tel Aviv, but the club still managed to win one championship and three Israel Football Association Cups. Among the great names of the decade were midfielder Nissim Bachar, defender Meir Nimni, defender Menachem "Miko" Bello, defender Tzvika Rosen, goalkeeper Haim Levin, midfielder Moshe Asis, striker Rafi Levi and midfielder Giora Spiegel.

=== 1970s ===
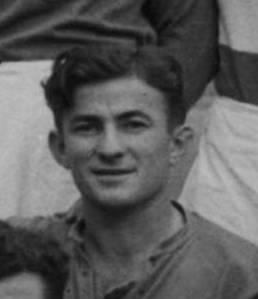
Jerry Beit haLevi won 10 championships and eight state cups with Maccabi as a player, coach and chairman.

By Maccabi Tel Aviv standards, the 1960s had not been a particularly successful decade. With the coming of the 1970s, all that was about to change. The very first year of the decade was a stellar indication of that change as the team, under the able leadership of David Schweitzer, won an historic double. The Israeli Football Association (IFA) Cup final was won with a 2–1 victory over Maccabi Netanya. The league title on the other hand was ensured only on goal difference, but one that was built in part upon one of the finest performances in the club's history, a 5–0 thrashing of city rivals Hapoel Tel Aviv in the Tel Aviv derby. On a rainy day at the end of January 1970, 20,000 spectators saw Maccabi midfielder Giora Shpiegel score a hat-trick to lead his side to victory. But despite that defeat, Hapoel stayed neck-and-neck with Maccabi until the last week and it was Hapoel who found themselves in second place on goal difference when the season reached its conclusion.

The following season was a weak one for Maccabi Tel Aviv that saw them finish tenth in the league table. But just one year later they were fully back on track winning their second championship of the decade in the 1971–72 season. One of the stars of that season, and one of the greatest strikers in the club's history, was Dror Bar Nur, who scored 16 of the club's 45 goals in the league and added two more in other competitions.

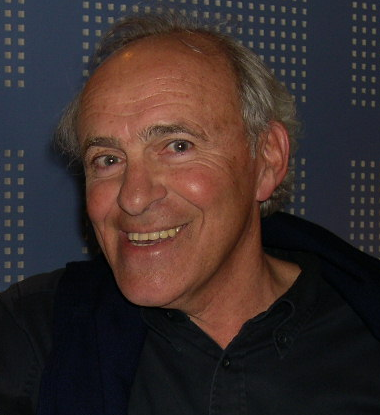
Mordechai "Motaleh" Spiegler

Just four years later Maccabi Tel Aviv found themselves for the first time in a relegation battle, with the final week of the 1975–76 season seeing no less than nine clubs battling it out to stay in the upper tier. Maccabi beat Beitar Jerusalem 2–0 with goals from strikers Rachamim Talbi and Benny Tabak, thus escaping what would have been the first drop in the club's history. In April of that same year, leaders of the English Football League First Division, Queens Park Rangers, arrived in Israel for a friendly to face a Maccabi Tel Aviv side bolstered by three of the Israeli Premier League's brightest stars of the time: Maccabi Netanya strikers Mordechai "Motaleh" Spiegler and Oded Machnes and Beitar Jerusalem midfielder Uri Malmilian. Maccabi won the match, 2–1, with goals from Malmilian and Spiegler.

A year later and once again Maccabi Tel Aviv went from near disaster to the league summit, securing in the 1976/77 season their second double of the decade. They won the title three points ahead of Maccabi Jaffa and with 47 goals, the highest number in the league. Striker Vicky Peretz finished as the league's leading goal scorer with 17 league goals and another five in IFA Cup competition. But it was Benny Tabak's lone goal against Beitar Tel Aviv in front of 30,000 spectators at Bloomfield Stadium that earned Maccabi the IFA Cup and their second double in the space of seven years.

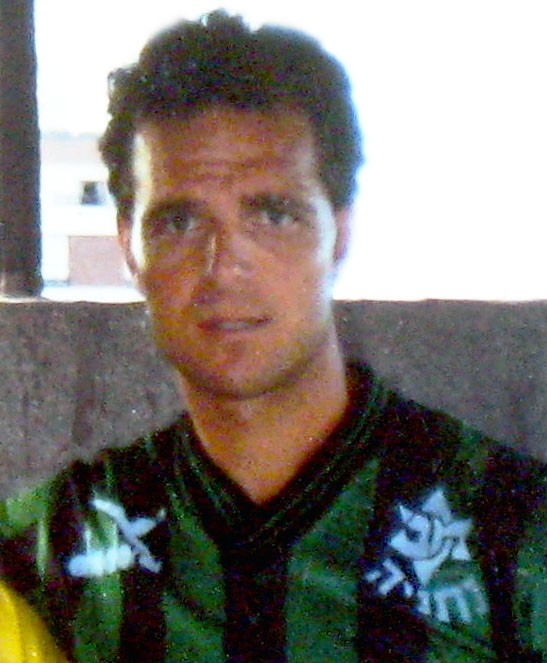
Avi Cohen played for the club for 13 seasons

Among the great Maccabi players of the time were strikers Benny Tabak and Vicky Peretz and the late Avi Cohen, who earned the nickname "Libero" (from the Italian, a fullback who is given freedom – libero – to roam from his position to play a role in offence as well) and is thought to be one of the greatest defenders in the history of Israeli football. One of his most memorable goals was in a 2–0 derby victory over Hapoel Tel Aviv in 1978, when the defender struck an absolutely unstoppable ball from the edge of the area straight into the opposition net. Vicky Peretz and Benny Tabak are remembered as two of the greatest strikers in the history of the club, with the former scoring 67 and the latter 121 goals in the yellow and blue jersey of Maccabi Tel Aviv.

=== 1980s ===
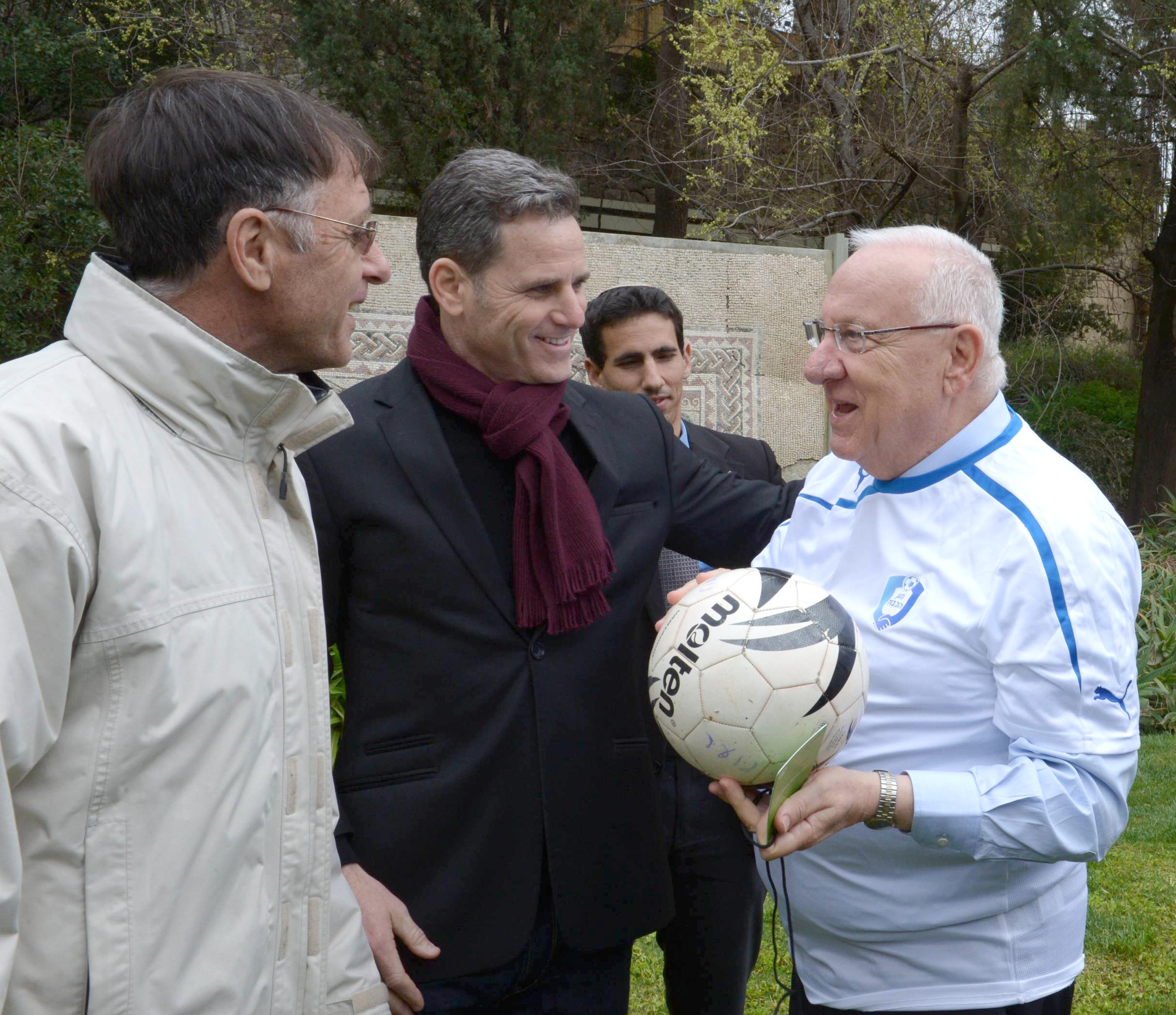
Oded Machnes and Bonni Ginzburg (from left to right), both played for Maccabi in the 80s

The 1980s saw a period of below par achievements for Maccabi Tel Aviv FC, earning the decade the nickname the "thin years". While adding two Israel Football Association (IFA) Cups to the trophy cabinet, the club remained without a league title throughout the decade. The first of the two consecutive IFA Cup triumphs, however, was won in dramatic fashion in a final against Maccabi Haifa in the 1986–87 season. While Maccabi Tel Aviv, third in the table, finished six places above their northern namesakes, the Cup final was a tight affair that ended 3–3 after extra time and was decided in a penalty shoot-out. And it was striker Benny Tabak's final kick that saw Maccabi Tel Aviv lift their first IFA Cup in ten years.

The following season Maccabi Tel Aviv, now under the stewardship of Giora Spiegel, underwent their worst defeat in the club's history, a 0–10 rout suffered at the hands of that same Maccabi Haifa. Yet only three weeks later the club appeared in their second consecutive intriguing IFA Cup final, this time against their arch big city rivals Hapoel Tel Aviv. Despite the fresh memories of their lacklustre performance in Haifa the team succeeded in returning to form thanks to a wonderful goal by midfielder Mickey Cohen and yet another from Benny Tabak that led to a 2–1 victory and a second straight IFA Cup title.

Another memorable event of the 1980s occurred at the beginning of the decade, in a match against Beitar Jerusalem held at the YMCA Stadium in Jerusalem in the second matchweek of the 1981–82 season. The match referee Avraham Klein, of international reputation, disallowed a Beitar goal but the players continued to celebrate. Maccabi defender Menahem "Miko" Belo quickly resumed play, passed on to midfielder Moti Ivanir who found himself facing the Beitar keeper Yossi Mizrachi on his own. To the great ire of the local fans he scored the goal that would ultimately lead to a 1–2 Maccabi victory.

Despite the less than scintillating nature of Maccabi's performances throughout the decade, the club had a number of outstanding players, including Moti Ivanir, midfielder Alon Natan, goalkeeper Bonni Ginzburg and striker Eli Driks who succeeded in leaving their mark on the club's history. Ivanir, who made his maiden performance for Maccabi aged 16, scored 67 times playing for the club throughout the decade, with the exception of the two years he spent at Dutch side Roda JC Kerkrade. Alon Natan found the net 40 times before leaving the club for Bnei Yehuda at the end of the 1989–90 season. He was subsequently forced into retirement at age 23 due to injury.

Bonni Ginzburg protected the Maccabi goal from the beginning of the decade until the 1987–88 season. He earned himself a place on the national squad and two years later became the first Israeli goalkeeper to play abroad. Eli Driks, one of the club's all-time greatest strikers, came through the youth ranks at the beginning of the 1980s and began a successful career at the fulcrum of the Maccabi Tel Aviv attack that lasted 20 years.

=== 1990s ===
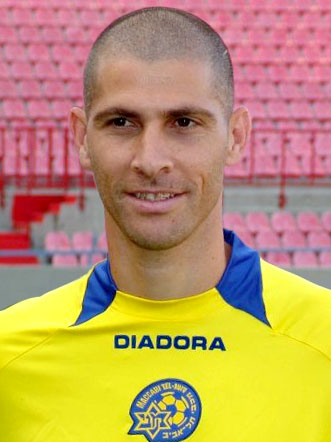
Avi Nimni, Maccabi's greatest player of the 1990s and the 2000s

After the decade of the 1980s, a young head coach by the name of Avram Grant took over the reins at Maccabi Tel Aviv and brought with him young players that together brought about one of the most successful decades in the club's history. By the time the decade had reached its halfway point the team had already won a "double" along with two more championships, two State Cups and one Toto (League) Cup, to which two more would be added before the decade had drawn to a close.

During the 1991–92 season, Maccabi Tel Aviv won its first league championship in 13 years. This success followed the signings of Russian national goalkeeper Alexander Ubarov, and defender Alexander Polukarov. Working alongside midfielder Uri Malmilyan and younger midfielders Avi Nimni and Itzik Zohar, the team returned to the upper tier of Israeli football.

In the 1992–93 season, the club won the Toto Cup. The team also won the State Cup final against rivals Hapoel Tel Aviv, with goals from Itsik Zohar and Nir Klinger. Although Maccabi Tel Aviv finished with 88 points, they did not secure the league title, or a double. Maccabi Haifa won the championship after completing all 39 league matches undefeated.

The following season, manager Avram Grant led Maccabi Tel Aviv to the league title. The championship was secured following a goal by defender Alon Brumer during a match in Beer Sheva.

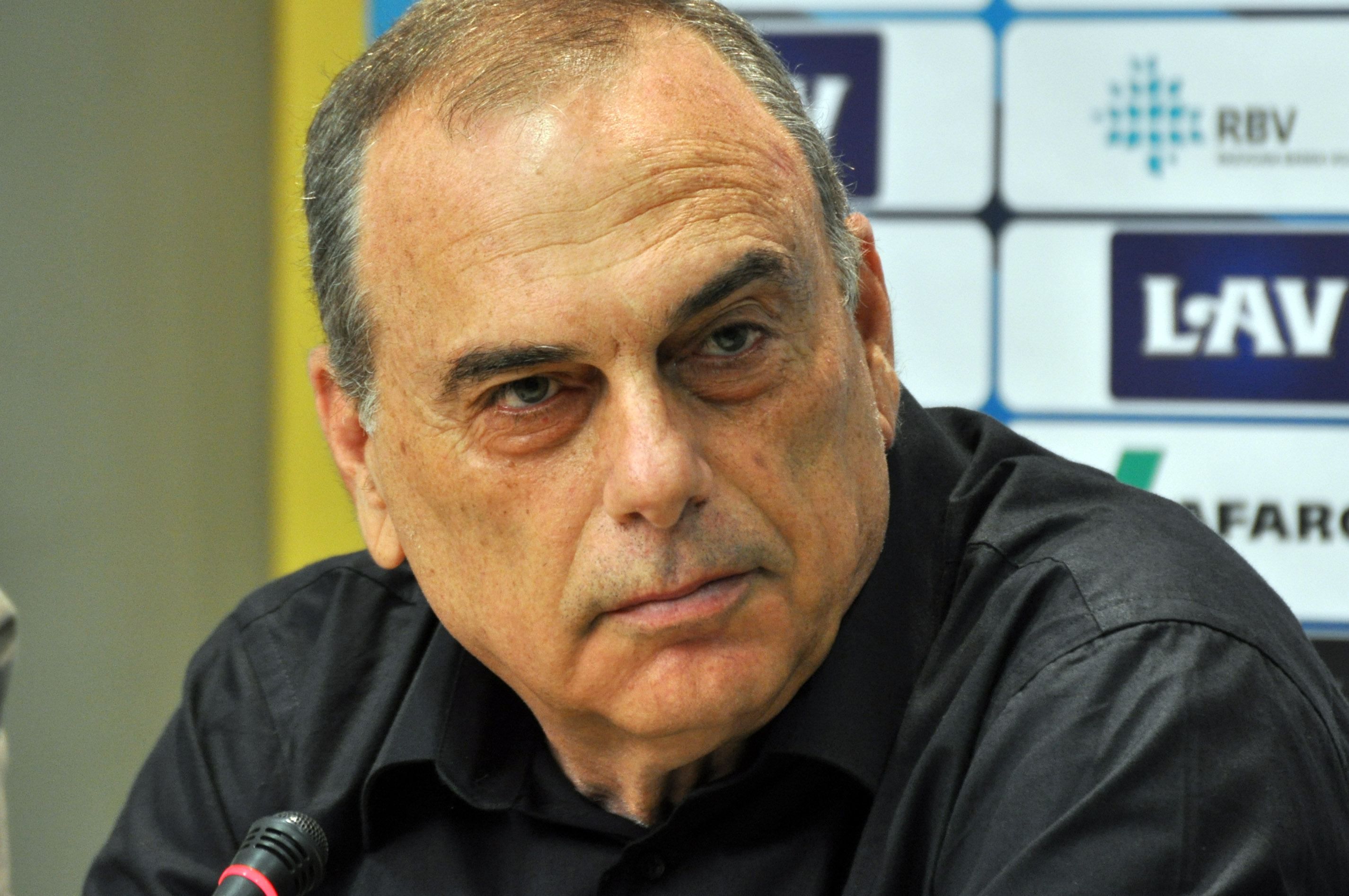
Avram Grant, Head coach, 1991–95, 1996–00

At the end of the 1995 season the "Mofet" Group took control of Maccabi Tel Aviv and as a result of Avraham Grant's decision to leave the club, a new coach, Dror Kashtan, took over the reins for what would prove to be one of the best seasons in the club's history. Their chief rivals were once again Maccabi Haifa, and the team traveled to their Kiryat Eliezer Stadium for what will always be remembered as the must-win match of that season. As the players headed for the dressing room trailing 1–0 at half time, coach Kashtan controversially decided to return his players to await their Maccabi Haifa rivals on the pitch. In the second half, goals by striker Eli Dricks and midfielders Nir Klinger and Avi Nimni turned the match around, and that 1–3 victory not only handed Maccabi Tel Aviv the championship but also paved the way for the "double" after a 4–1 thrashing of Hapoel Rishon Lezion in the State Cup final.

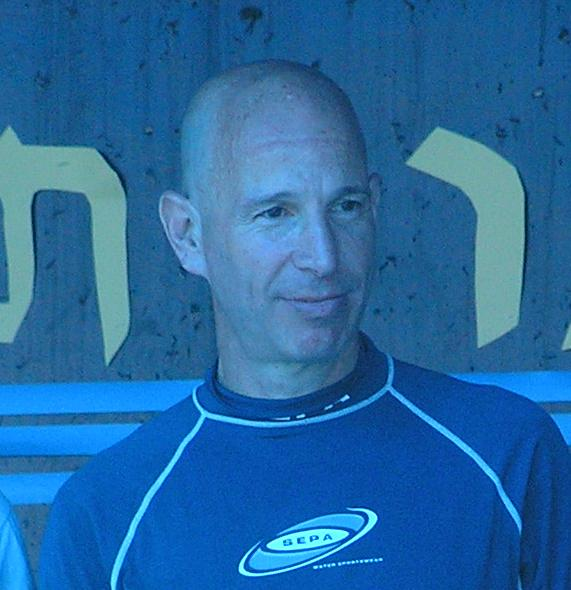
Loni Herzikovich, former owner

With Israel's entrance into European football in 1992, Maccabi Tel Aviv also turned their attention to leaving their mark in this prestigious competition as well. The 1992–93 season marked the first time Maccabi Tel Aviv competed in UEFA Champions League qualifiers and in the first round they defeated the Maltese club Valletta but lost to Belgian side Club Brugge in the second round. In the 1994–95 season, Maccabi were knocked out in the second round of the UEFA Cup Winners' Cup by German side Werder Bremen on a 2–0 aggregate. The following season Maccabi once again tried their luck in the Champions League qualifiers and almost succeeded, but a 2–1 aggregate loss to the Swiss club Grasshopper handed the latter the keys to the group stages. In 1996, it was the powerful Turkish side Fenerbahçe that stood between Maccabi and the group stages and in the resultant UEFA Cup competition they encountered, and subsequently lost to, the Spanish club Tenerife. In the 1999–00 season, Maccabi got past Lithuanian opponents FBK Kaunas in the UEFA Cup qualifiers but then lost to French competitors Lens 4–3 on aggregate in round one.

In the 1990s Maccabi Tel Aviv were blessed with many talented players, among them defenders Amir Shelach and the Brumer brothers Gadi and Alon, midfielder Noam Shoham and strikers Meir Melika and Nir Sivilia. Leading the team were Nir Klinger, Itzik Zohar, and midfielder Avi Nimni. In 1997, the "Mofet" Group broke up and the club was taken over by Loni Herzikovich.

=== 2000s ===
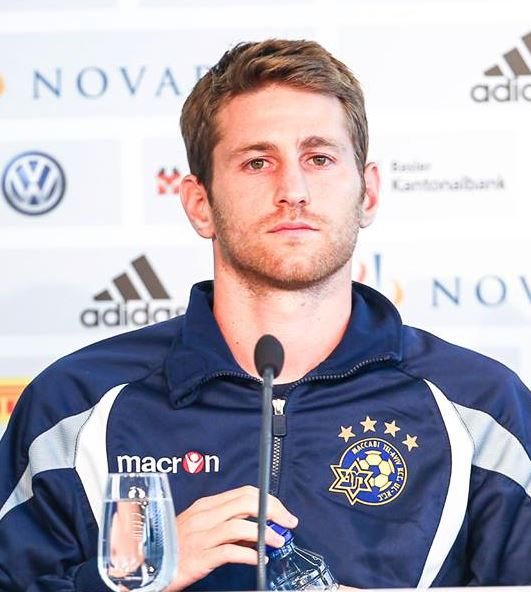
Sheran Yeini played 15 years in the club, and is the captain of the team

Maccabi Tel Aviv won the State Cup in the 2000–01 and 2001–02 seasons under head coach Nir Klinger. In the 2000–01 season, the club finished fourth in the Israeli Premier League and scored 71 goals. Results from that season included a 7–0 win against Beitar Jerusalem and a 10–1 win against Hapoel Rishon LeZion in January. The team won the State Cup final 3–0 against Maccabi Petah Tikva.

The following season will largely be remembered for the tragic event that occurred on 26 January 2002 during a match against Beitar Jerusalem. Without a preceding incident, Maccabi defender Meni Levi suddenly collapsed in the middle of the pitch, picked himself up and then collapsed again. He received treatment on the pitch for quite a long time before being rushed to a hospital. The game, in the meantime, was not resumed. For a number of years Levi received treatment at the rehabilitation facility Beit Levinstein in Ra'anana but unfortunately was unable to recover and was returned to his family. Subsequently, the club decided to retire Levi's number twelve jersey entirely. As the year progressed the team succeeded in recovering from this tragic incident and ended the season with their second State Cup title in as many years. In the final, Maccabi Tel Aviv won a penalty shoot-out against that season's champion, Maccabi Haifa, after extra time saw the two sides locked in a goalless draw.

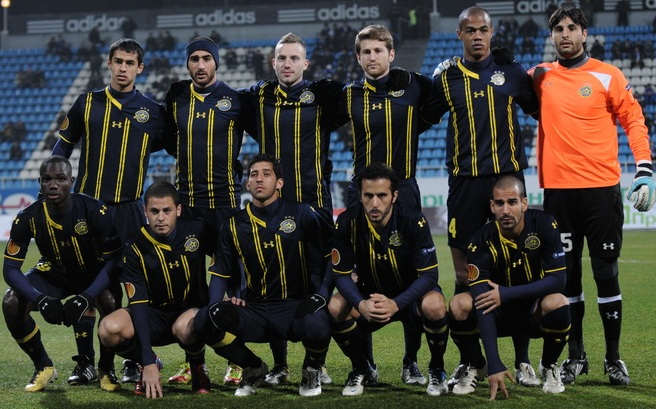
Team photo before a match against Dynamo Kyiv

The following season Maccabi Tel Aviv won a dramatic league championship from title rivals Maccabi Haifa. On the eve of the last day of the season, head coach Nir Klinger's lads led the league table on goal difference alone. On the day itself Maccabi Haifa led 0–5 at half time against Ashdod while Maccabi were still looking for their first goal against Hapoel Petah Tikva. Only in the second half did they score the three goals (to no reply) that pushed their goal difference past Maccabi Haifa and brought the Championship plate back to the Maccabi Tel Aviv trophy cabinet.

Maccabi's most significant achievement of the decade came in the 2004–05 season when the team reached the group stages of the Champions League. In the play-off stages they beat the Greek side PAOK and became Israel's second club, after Maccabi Haifa two years earlier, to reach the group stages. There they were drawn against three giants of European football, the German Bayern Munich, the Italian Juventus and the Dutch Ajax. Nonetheless, Maccabi succeeded in finishing the group stage with a precious four points after beating Ajax and drawing with Juventus at home. Paradoxically they ended an unstable league season eighth in the table but once again came away with the State Cup after winning a penalty shoot-out in a final against Maccabi Herzliya that ended 2–2 after extra time.

After this third State Cup in five seasons, Maccabi's fortunes dipped drastically and other clubs took turns winning the league and the Cup. The 2005–06 season will be remembered in particular, earning the nickname "the Galacticos season", for a team that brought together the likes of Israeli international Eyal Berkovic, Croatian star Đovani Roso and Maccabi all-time great Avi Nimni. Despite the star-studded squad, Maccabi failed to translate that quality into winning form and ended the season in the bottom half of the table.

On 28 December 2007, during the 2007–08 season, the club was transferred to the hands of billionaire Alex Shnaider. Shnaider diverted large sums of money to the club, mainly for paying off debts and for developing the youth department. In 2008 alone, Shnaider invested nearly NIS₪40 million from his own money into the club. Overall, in just over a year's time, Shnaider had invested approximately US$20 million in the team.

On 3 August 2009, Shnaider passed the team on to another Canadian billionaire's hands, Mitchell Goldhar. This handover was done for no cost, but against a commitment to pay off the team's debts to Loni Herzkovitz.

=== 2010s ===
In the 2010–11 season, Maccabi enjoyed one moment of glory in Europe, beating a strong Greek Olympiacos side 1–0 in the home leg of the UEFA Europa League qualifiers. The victory sent Maccabi into the first round of the competition where, despite an exciting 4–3 victory in the home leg, Maccabi failed to surpass French giants Paris Saint-Germain after a 2–0 loss in the French capital. The following season Maccabi claimed a famous victory against Greek side Panathinaikos, beating them 3–0 at Bloomfield Stadium in the qualifying stages of the Europa League. It was a year Maccabi actually did succeed in reaching the group stage of the competition but collected just two points in a group that contained Turkish side Beşiktaş, the Ukrainians Dynamo Kyiv and the English Stoke City.

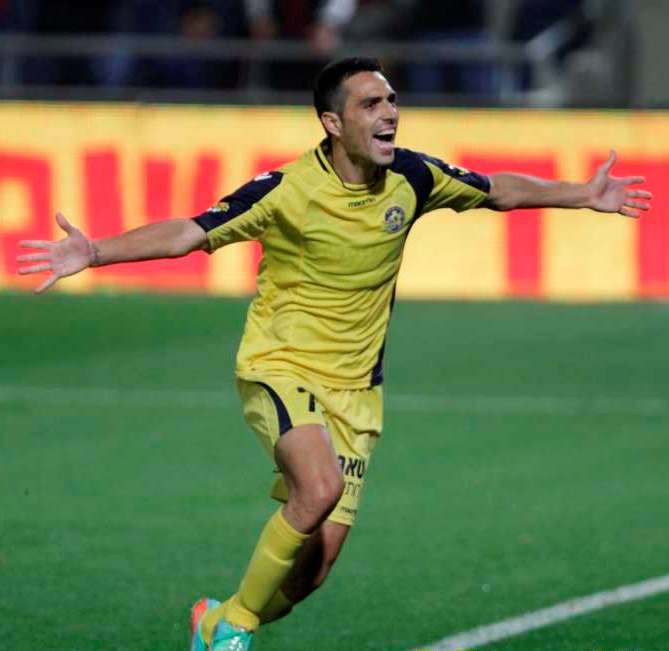
Eran Zahavi, 99 goals in 120 league apps for Maccabi

The 2012–13 season finally put an end to Maccabi Tel Aviv's bad fortunes in the league as they won their first championship in a decade. Under the stewardship of the new Director of Football Jordi Cruyff and Spanish head coach Óscar García, Maccabi dominated the league and claimed the title by thirteen points ahead of their nearest rival. They finished the season with the league's highest goal total of 78 while conceding the fewest with just 30 goals conceded. Leading that attack was the league's highest goal scorer, striker Eliran Atar with 22, but he was joined by midfielder Maharan Radi with eight (plus eleven assists), young striker Mu'nas Dabbur with ten and Swedish striker Rade Prica (eight) and midfielder Eran Zahavi (seven) who both arrived at the club in the January transfer window. In defense, the tone was set by Maccabi's two center halves, Eitan Tibi and the Spaniard Carlos García, backed up by the excellence of Maccabi Tel Aviv's Nigerian goalkeeper, Vincent Enyeama.

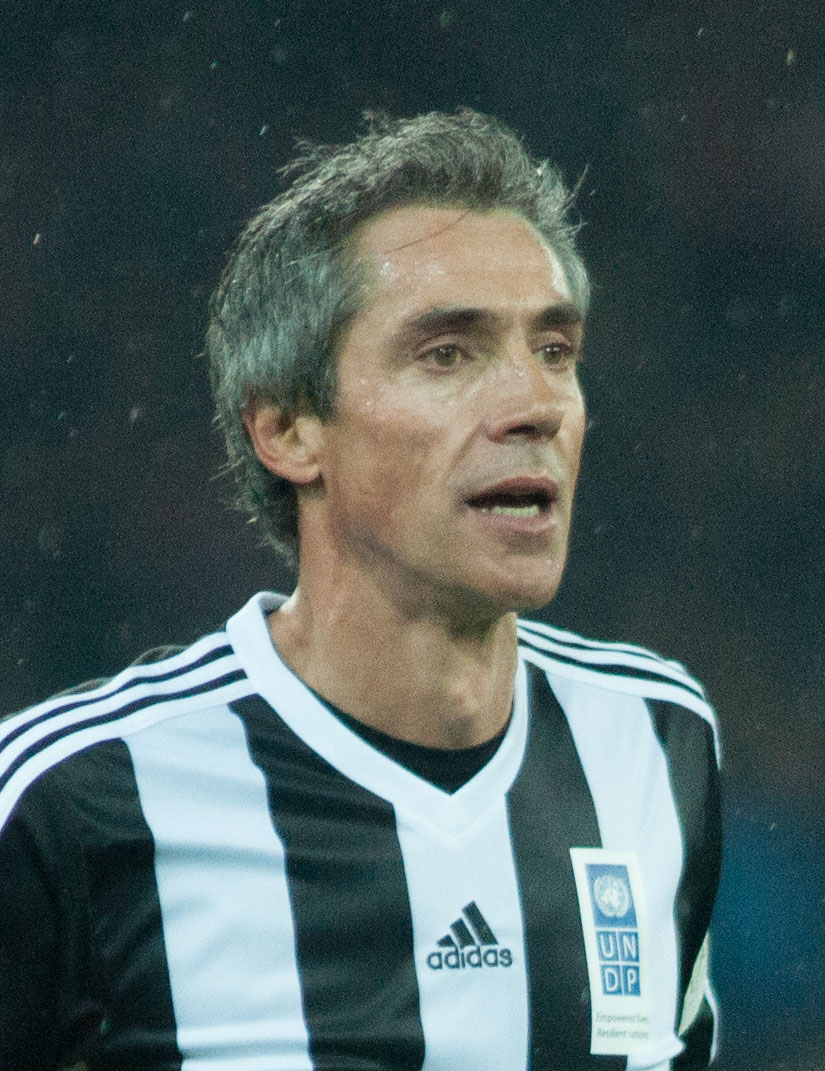
Paulo Sousa, Coach in 2013–14

The 2013–14 season saw a change in the club's Coach Position with Paulo Sousa replacing Oscar Garcia, as well as several players leaving and new players arriving. Notably Vincent Enyeama left for Lille with Goalkeeper Juan Pablo Colinas joining between the posts, and Nikola Mitrović joining from Videoton. The team continued its success in the league and claimed another championship behind Eran Zahavi's goal scoring. The Team's main rivals this season were Hapoel Be'er Sheva who came in second. The team also enjoyed relative success in the UEFA Europa League as they advanced to the round of 32 after a difficult group stage, before ultimately being ousted by Basel.

The 2014–15 season was characterized by a difficult start. The 2014 Israel–Gaza conflict meant that the qualifying games to the UEFA Champions League were held away from Israel, leading Maccabi to be ousted from both the Champions League and the Europa League. There was also a shake-up at the coach position as Paulo Sousa left for Basel. Óscar García returned but left before the beginning of the season and was replaced by Pako Ayestarán, who took charge for the full campaign. During the Tel Aviv Derby on 3 November 2014, a fan from Hapoel Tel Aviv broke onto the pitch with an intent to assault Maccabi star Eran Zahavi, who was shown a red card for defending himself. In the aftermath of the event, both teams had 1 point redacted and forfeited the match. Under Ayestarán, Maccabi went on to become the first Israeli team to win all three major domestic trophies in a single season: the Premier League, the State Cup and the Toto Cup. This remains the only domestic treble ever achieved in Israeli football, and is regarded as one of the most significant seasons in the club's history. Notable new players in the team were Nosa Igiebor and Eden Ben Basat. The best player in the squad was still Eran Zahavi, who broke the Israeli record for consecutive scoring games and scored 27 goals throughout the season.

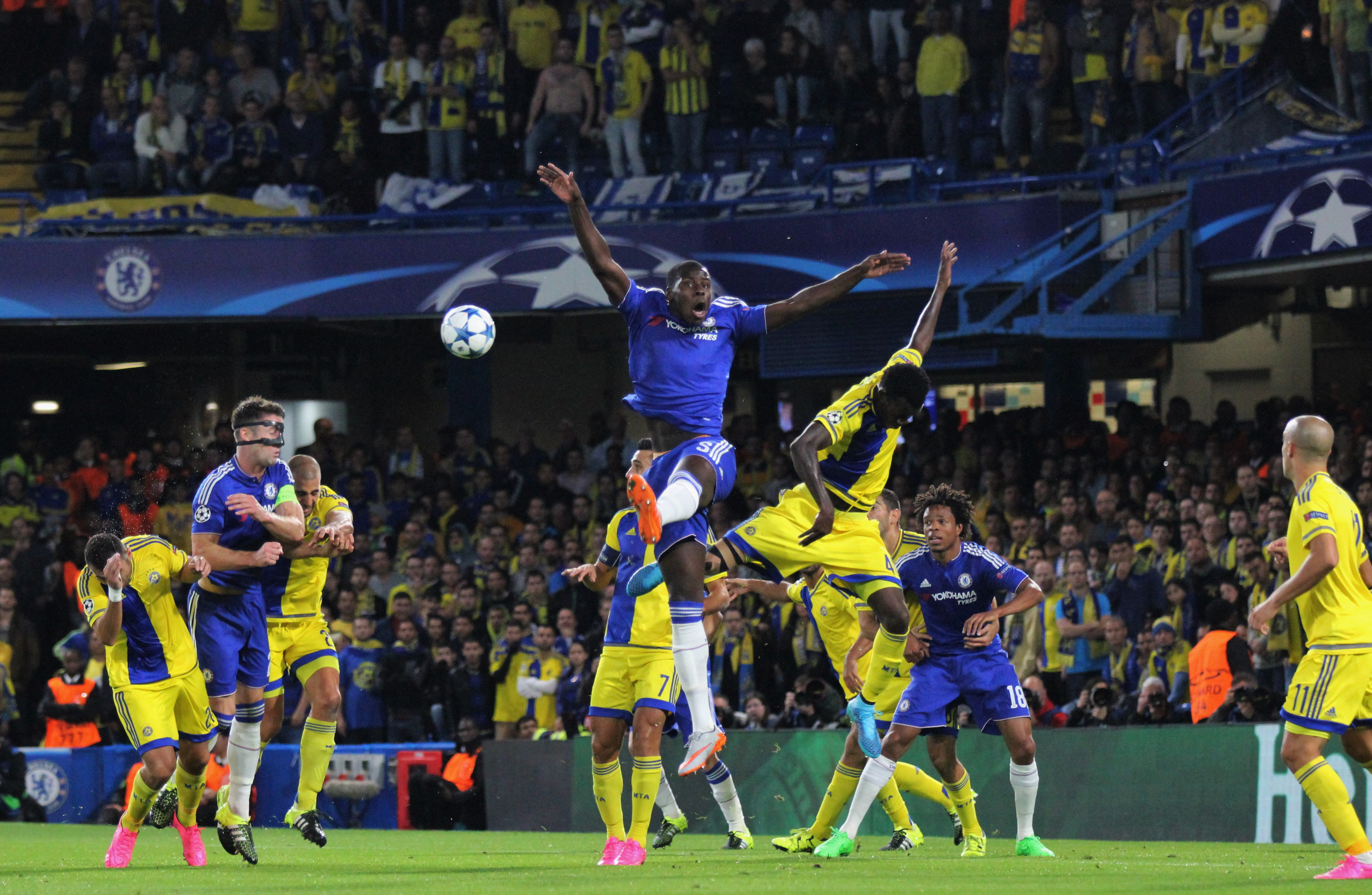
Maccabi vs. Chelsea in 2015–16 Champions League group stage

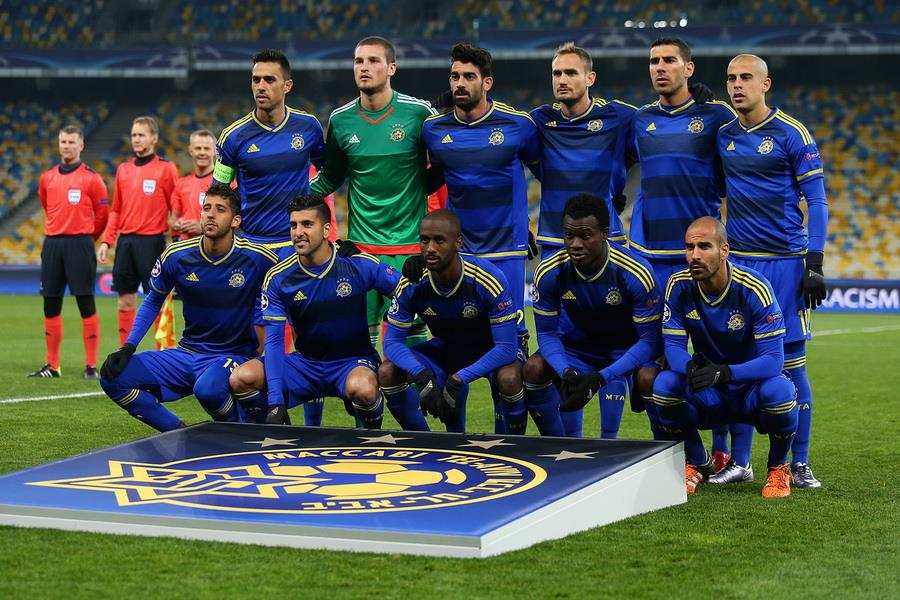
Team photo taken before a match against Dynamo Kyiv in 2015–16 UEFA Champions League

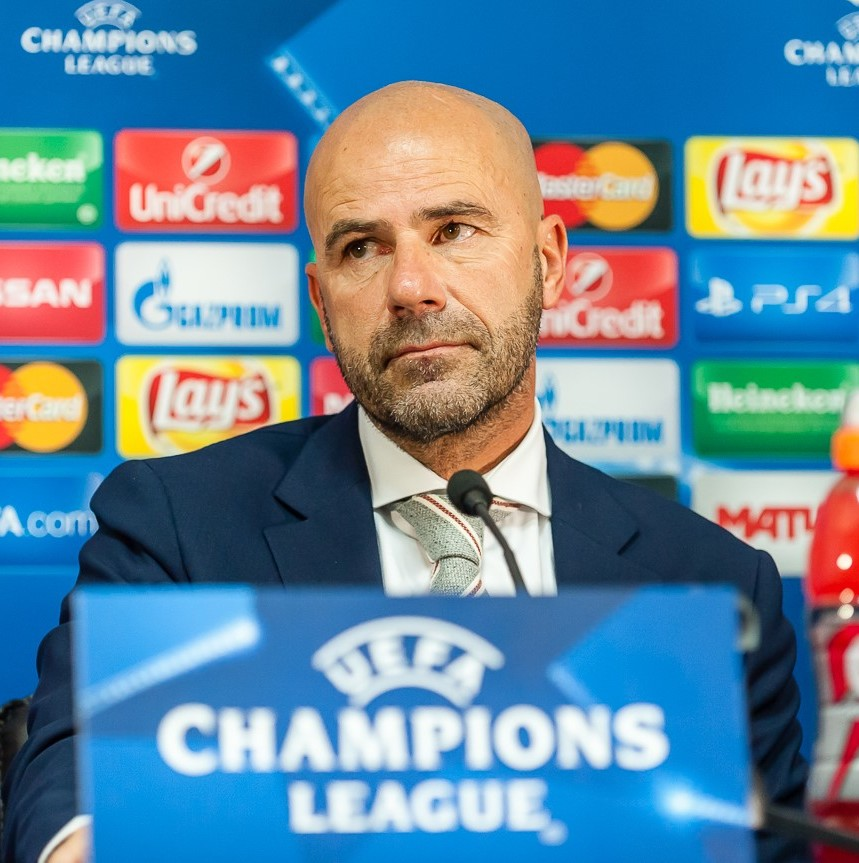
Peter Bosz, coached in 2016

In the 2015–16 season, the team qualified for the UEFA Champions League group stage for the first time in 11 years. They were a member of Group G, along with Chelsea, Porto and Dynamo Kyiv. However, these three elite clubs proved to be too much for Maccabi Tel Aviv to handle, and they lost all 6 of their group stage matches, scoring just 1 goal while conceding 16. Maccabi were eliminated in the group stage of the Toto Cup AI. In the league, Maccabi's main rivals for the title were Hapoel Be'er Sheva. After a loss to Hapoel Be'er Sheva at Bloomfield Stadium thanks to two clinical goals from Elyaniv Barda and Maor Melikson, head coach Slavisa Jokanovic was signed by Fulham and replaced by Peter Bosz, who helped improve Maccabi's performances in the league. Be'er Sheva fell under huge pressure before the end of the season, which helped Maccabi fight back and get into the title race again. Maccabi managed to take advantage of Be'er Sheva's bad results, beating Beitar Jerusalem in a close and dramatic tie, where Eran Zahavi scored the winning goal for Maccabi in the 90th minute, breaking the goalscoring record of Nisim Elmaliah by scoring more than 31 goals in one league season. In the biggest game of the season, against Hapoel Be'er Sheva, a win would have brought Maccabi to 1st place because of their goal difference, while any other result would have left Hapoel Be'er Sheva alone at 1st place with a 3 points advantage and only 3 games to go. Maccabi tied the game 0-0, leaving Hapoel Be'er Sheva 3 points ahead of Maccabi and top of the league. Maccabi continued their bad form and dropped points again in their next game, this time against Hapoel Ra'anana, drawing 1-1, and the title came closer to Hapoel Be'er Sheva, who had a 5 points advantage with only 2 games to go. The last game of the league season was a rollercoaster of emotions for Maccabi fans who were hoping for Be'er Sheva to lose against Sakhnin, and who needed to defeat Maccabi Haifa to win the championship. Sakhnin took the lead after 6 minutes, however, Be'er Sheva responded quickly and got a goal after only 10 minutes. At that stage, Be'er Sheva were championed as Maccabi kept on searching for a goal, which finally came when Eran Zahavi scored, which meant Maccabi were the champions at the time. 12 minutes after Maccabi's goal, Be'er Sheva went 2–1 up. Maccabi got a 6–0 lead over Haifa but was unable to win the title, as Be'er Sheva had scored the third goal and became champions. The State Cup Final was Maccabi's last chance to win a trophy this season, and they faced Maccabi Haifa in the final. However, Haifa defeated Maccabi 1-0 and won their first cup in 18 years, which caused Peter Bosz to be released to Ajax as Maccabi had finished with no trophies. The 2015–16 season was called "the worst year in Jordi's Era". Eran Zahavi, Maccabi's star player, was sold to Guangzhou R&F for 8.5 million dollars at the end of the season.

The following campaign Shota Arveladze was named Head Coach and successfully helped the Club advance to the Europa League Group stages where they played Zenit, Alkmaar and Dundalk. Over the course of the 2016/17 season, Maccabi defeated Hapoel Tel Aviv 5:0 which tied the biggest Derby victory set in 1969/70. Arveladze left the Club midway through the campaign and was replaced by Angolan Lito Vidigal as the squad ended the season in 2nd place while falling in the Cup Final.

Jordi Cruyff was appointed Head Coach for the 2017–18 season as the Sports Director moved down to the sidelines in his 6th season with the Yellow & Blue. The Club advanced to the Europa League Group Stage for the second straight season where they faced Astana, Slavia Prague and Villarreal, defeating the La Liga side in Spain 1:0. Maccabi captured the Toto Cup while finishing in second place in league play.

Vladimir Ivic was appointed head coach at the start of the 2018/19 season. Under the Serbian coach, Maccabi had an impressive season and set many records. The Yellow & Blue won the league championship by a 31-point margin, recorded 89 points (club record), and won the title by the end of March, the earliest ever. The club also won the Toto Cup for the second straight season with a 2:1 win over Maccabi Haifa in the final.

The following season under Ivic the team continued their successful run in the league and won a second successive league title. During that season, Maccabi kept a clean sheet for 14 matches, conceded a total of only 10 league goals thus shattering the all-time Israeli top-flight records. At the end of the season, Ivic ended his role as Maccabi's Head Coach.

=== 2020s ===
Ahead of the 2020–21 season Maccabi appointed Georgios Donis of Greece as the successor of Ivic before the league season had begun. The club added two titles to their trophy cabinet by winning the Super Cup and Toto Cup.

In June 2023, Maccabi appointed Robbie Keane as their new coach.

== Kit manufacturers and shirt sponsors ==
Period	Kit manufacturer	Shirt partner
2021–	Fila	Israel Canada
2019–21	Fila	Penguin Pickup
2018–19	Self Made	Penguin Pickup
2017–18	Self Made	None
2016–17	Adidas	None
2015–16	Adidas	UNICEF
2014–15	Adidas	UNICEF (from May 2015)
2013–14	Macron	None
2011–13	Under Armour	None
2010–11	Puma	Paygea
2009–10	Kappa	Paygea
2008–09	Diadora	Chevrolet
2007–08	Diadora	Cellcom
2006–07	Diadora	Chevrolet (2006)/Sony Bravia (2006–07)
2005–06	Diadora	Resido
2001–05	Diadora	Bezeq
2000–01	Adidas	Bezeq
1999–00	Adidas	Sony
1998–99	Adidas	Visa
1993–98	Diadora	Visa
1991–93	Diadora	Ruffles (potato chips)
1990–91	Diadora	First International Bank of Israel
1987–88	Puma	Delta Textile
1982–87	Puma	Baruch Fashion
1978–79	Umbro	Goldstar

Last updated: 30 Jan 2023
Source: MaccabiPedia/Uniform portal

== Supporters and politics ==
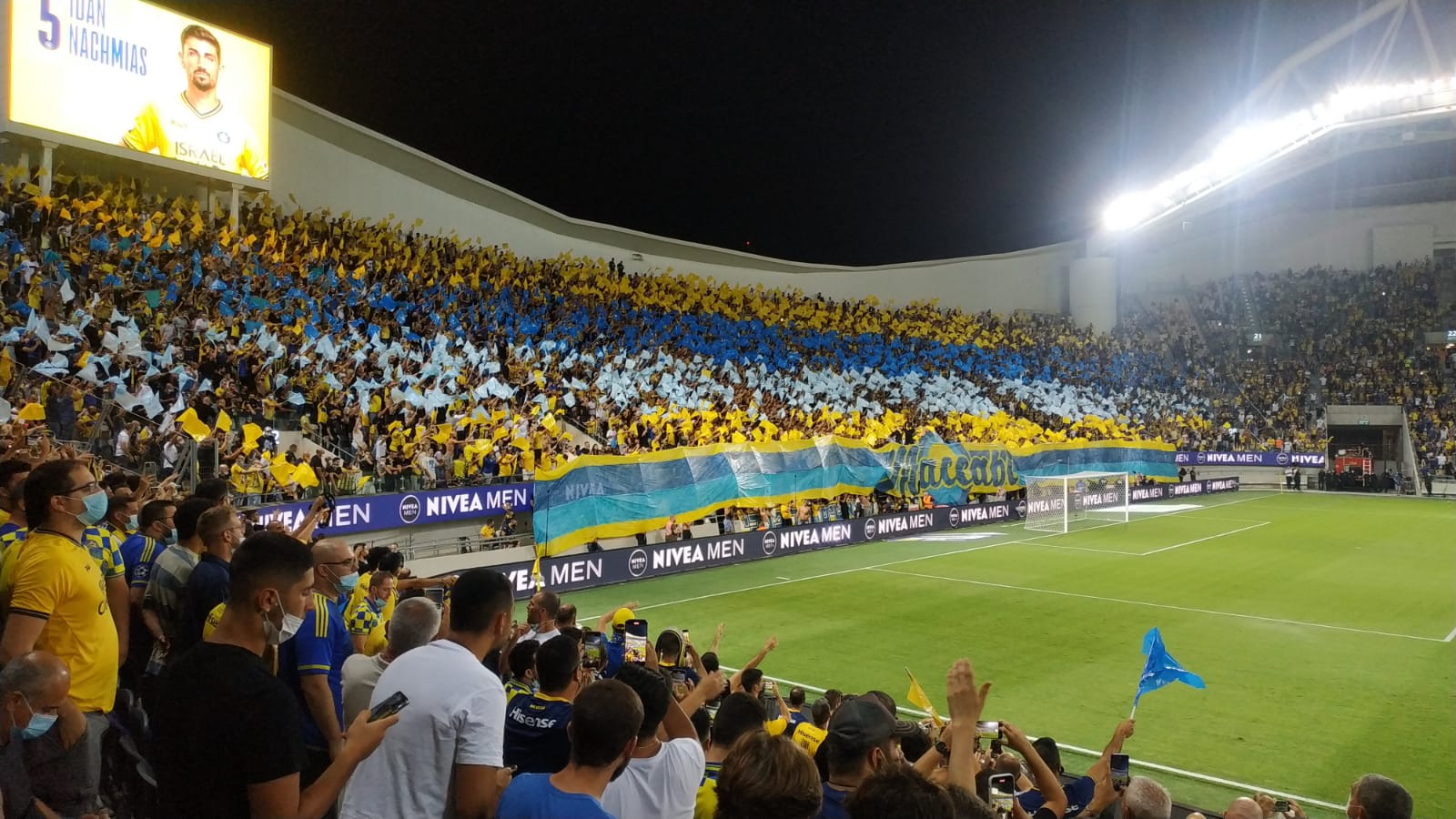
Maccabi fans in Bloomfield Stadium

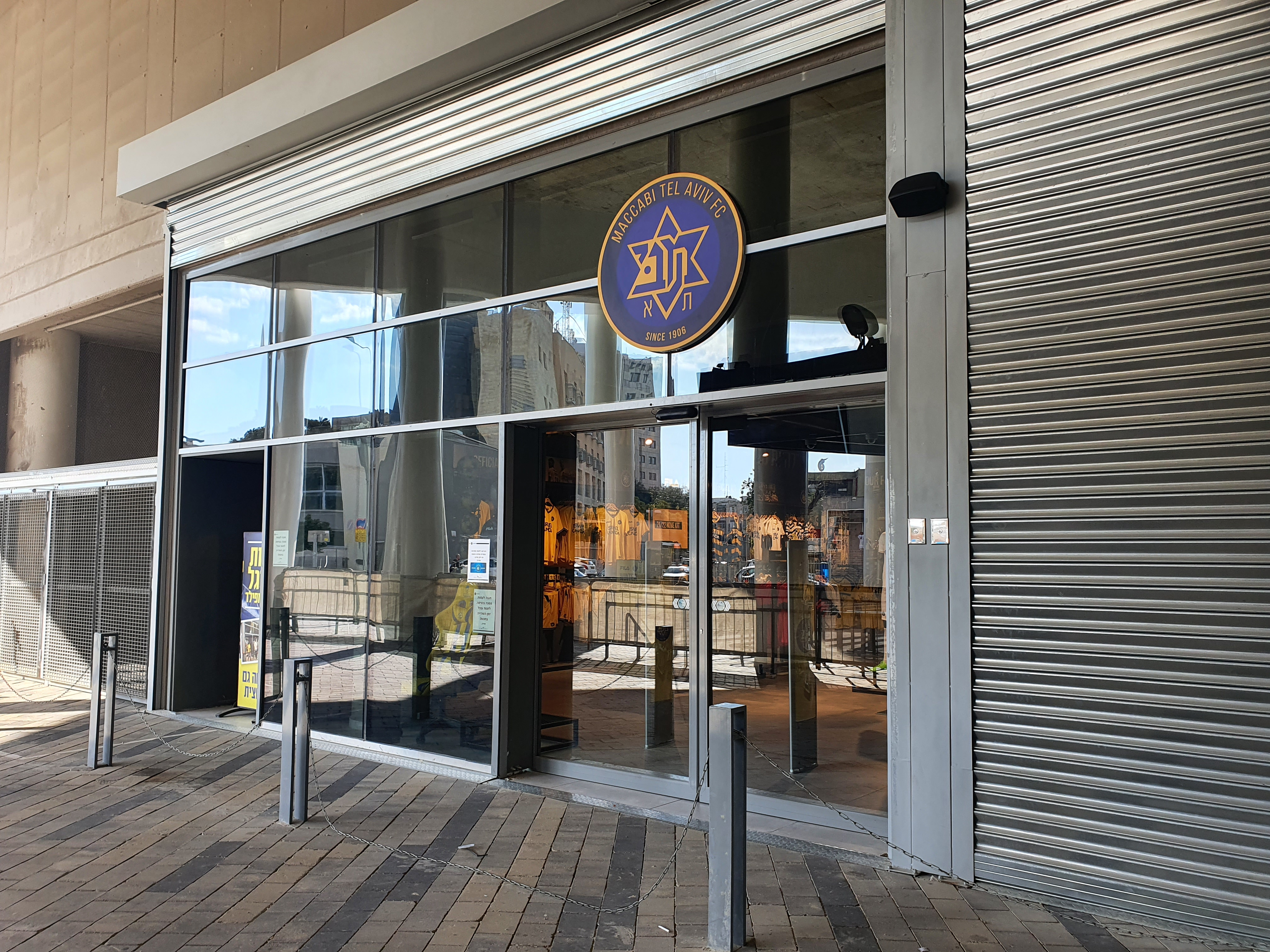
Maccabi Official Shop in Bloomfield Stadium

A survey conducted in March 2012 by Yedioth showed that Maccabi Tel Aviv was the second-most popular team among Israeli football fans (23%) right after rivals Maccabi Haifa (28%). The same survey revealed that 33% of Tel Aviv residents support the team.

Reports by the New Israel Fund have found Maccabi Tel Aviv as having the second-most racist fans in Israel, behind Beitar Jerusalem.

Fans have been known to yell racist slurs and insults at Arab and black players. Players on the team often face racist abuse from the team's own fans. Fans would yell anti-Arab slurs at Maharan Radi, an Arab player, and yell monkey noises at Baruch Dego, an Ethiopian-Jewish player.

During the 2020–2021 protests against Benjamin Netanyahu, Maccabi fans attacked protestors with batons and broken bottles.

=== November 2024 Amsterdam riots ===
In November 2024, Maccabi fans clashed with pro-Palestinian mob in Amsterdam after a UEFA Europa League match against Ajax. Prior to the clashes Maccabi fans were accused by pro-Palestinian activists for yelling anti-Palestinian chants, though it is unclear who started the clash first. Four local individuals who attacked Maccabi fans were given jail terms by Amsterdam district court.

=== November 2024 match against Beşiktaş ===
The Turkish government decided that the following 28 November 2024 UEFA Europa League match against Beşiktaş would be played in a neutral country due to the possibility of further supporter violence. The match was played in the empty Debreceni VSC stadium in Hungary. Hungary had already hosted several Israel national football team home games since the Gaza war began.

=== October 2025 ban of supporters from attending the Aston Villa match ===
In October 2025 West Midlands Police announced a ban on supporters of Israeli football club Maccabi Tel Aviv attending a UEFA Europa League match against Aston Villa in Birmingham scheduled for 6 November. The ban was justified by police due to concerns about potential violence and hooliganism among a section of Maccabi fans, including claims about incidents around a November 2024 match in Amsterdam. West Midlands Police initially stated that the local Jewish community had objected to the presence of Maccabi fans, but later conceded this was not the case, and that the threat of antisemitic hate crime was not cited as the main reason for the ban.

The ban drew criticism from UK political leaders, including Prime Minister Keir Starmer, who stated that police should ensure all football fans could enjoy the game without fear of violence or intimidation, as well as Kemi Badenoch and Ed Davey. British MP Ayoub Khan urged the ban was justified after a football match between Hapoel and Maccabi on 19 October was called off due to rioting. Chief Superintendent Tom Joyce of West Midlands Police explained the ban was intended to mitigate "significant levels of hooliganism" and related threats from some local groups, including the suggestion of arming themselves if Maccabi fans were allowed to attend.

An independent review by His Majesty's Inspectorate of Constabulary and Fire & Rescue Services in January 2026 found that the threat had been overstated and based on inaccurate intelligence, including references to incidents that had not occurred. The review and surrounding controversy intensified criticism from lawmakers, Jewish organisations, and civil liberties groups over alleged discrimination and bias in the treatment of Israeli and Jewish fans. The Israeli Foreign Ministry condemned the ban as "utterly disgraceful," explicitly characterizing it as "antisemitism" and the "scapegoating of Israelis and Jews."

Following the review, Home Secretary Shabana Mahmood told Parliament that she had lost confidence in Chief Constable Craig Guildford’s leadership, citing the force's handling of the incident, its failure to engage adequately with affected Jewish communities, and the damage caused to public trust. Guildford announced his immediate retirement on 16 January 2026.

=== Maccabi Fanatics ===
Maccabi has one main fan organization, "Maccabi Fanatics", which are located in Gate 11. Maccabi Fanatics are close friends with VAK410 (Ajax ultras) since the 2000s.

== Rivalries ==
=== Rivalry with Hapoel Tel Aviv ===
Maccabi's main rivals are Hapoel Tel Aviv. The matches between the teams gain a lot of attention in the Israeli public and are referred to as the "Tel Aviv derby".

=== Rivalry with Maccabi Haifa ===
Maccabi are also rivals of Maccabi Haifa, the second most successful Israeli football club. Matches between the two are often referred to as the "Israeli Clasico".

== Grounds and stadiums ==
=== 1923–1926: Palms Ground ===
The Palms Ground that was located in the Florentin was used by Maccabi in 1923–1926.

=== 1926–1935: Maccabi Ground ===
The Maccabi Ground that was located between Neve Sha'anan and Shapira was used by Maccabi in 1926–1935.

=== 1935–1969: Maccabiah Stadium ===
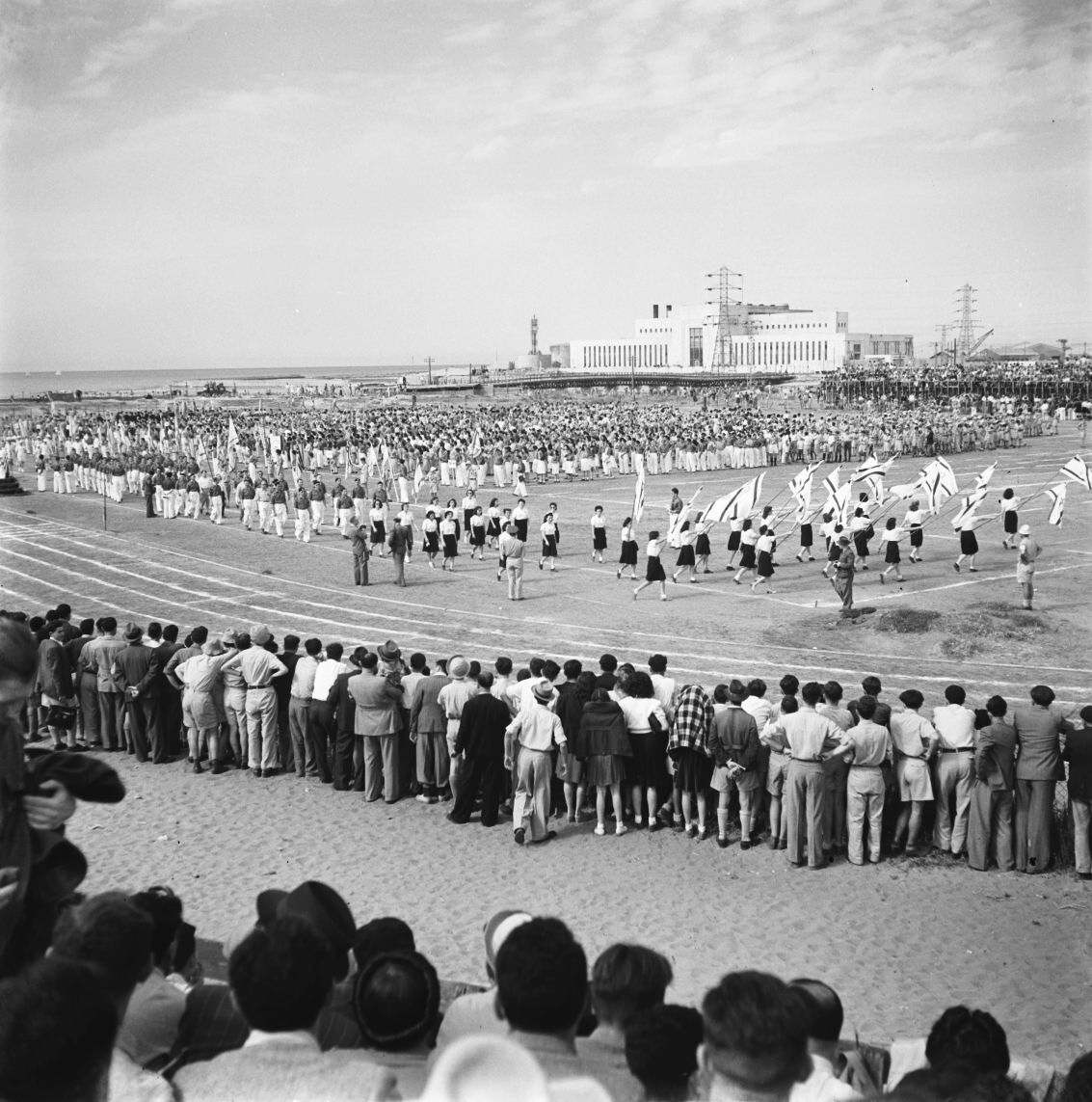
Maccabiah Stadium in 1946

Maccabiah Stadium, which was located near Yarkon River in Tel Aviv, had a capacity of 20,000, and was used by Maccabi for 26 seasons. (except for the 1963–1964, 1964–1965 and 1965–1966 seasons when Maccabi played at Bloomfield Stadium)

=== 1985–2000: Ramat Gan Stadium ===
Ramat Gan Stadium with a capacity of 41,583 was used by Maccabi in the late 1980s and 1990s, except for the 1986–1987 and 1995–1996 seasons when Maccabi played at Bloomfield Stadium.

=== 1969–1985, 2000–present: Bloomfield Stadium ===
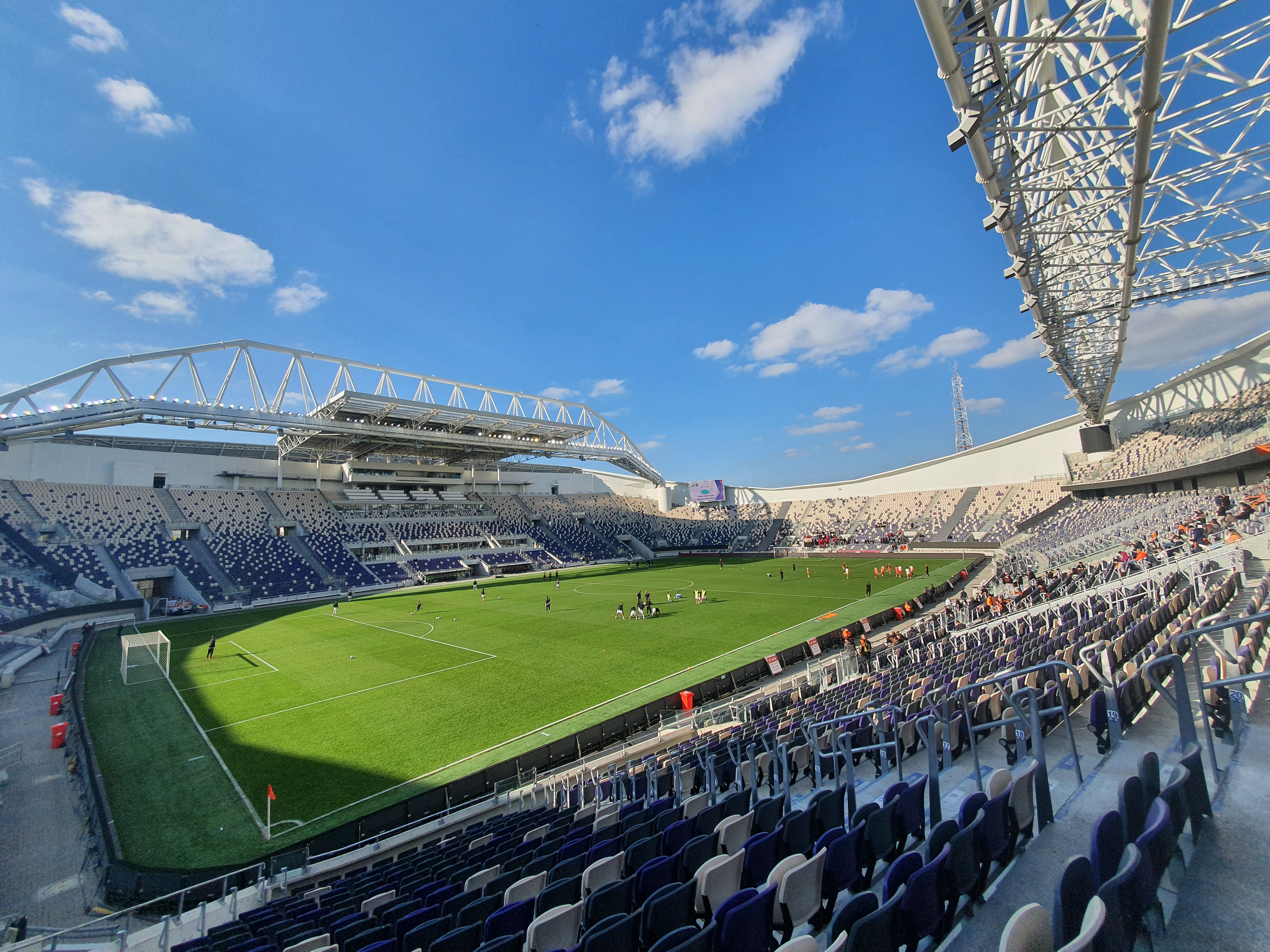
Bloomfield Stadium

Bloomfield Stadium in Tel Aviv with a capacity of 29,400 has been the team's stadium since 1969, Maccabi's main fans gate is gate 11 where the Maccabi Fanatics lead the cheering.

==== Kiryat Shalom Training Ground ====
The Maccabi Tel Aviv Training Ground is located in south Tel Aviv, near the Holon Intersection and on the outskirts of the Kiryat Shalom neighbourhood. The various Maccabi Tel Aviv teams began practicing at the complex in the mid-1970s, starting with the Youth Division teams, and joined later by the senior team. The facility consists of four pitches that serve all the Maccabi Tel Aviv teams and includes two gyms, treatment rooms and classrooms. The senior team practice at the western facility, near the locker rooms, on an area one and a half times larger than a regular football pitch, with renovated terraces that seat approximately 100 fans.

On 6 March 2012, the Youth Division Complex was officially re-dedicated in the name of the late Avi Cohen.

Not far from the senior team's training ground is a synthetic pitch, one of the first of its kind in Israel, which serves as the training ground for all the teams in the Maccabi Tel Aviv Youth Division. At the northern end of the complex is the central pitch of the Youth Division, lined by two terraces with a seating capacity of over 200 and equipped for television broadcasts. The central pitch is used primarily by the Maccabi Tel Aviv Under-19 squad, but the club's youth teams also make use of the facility. The fourth and smallest of the pitches is the eastern one, used mainly for training and frequently for matches of the children's teams. The Youth Division complex has ten dressing rooms, one of which is used by visiting teams and one extra room for the referees on match days. During the 2011–12 season an exercise room was also built on the ground for the use of the entire Youth Division.

== Current season ==
=== 2025–26 Israeli Premier League ===
==== Regular season ====
Pos	Team	Pld	W	D	L	GF	GA	GD	Pts	Qualification
1	Hapoel Be'er Sheva	26	18	5	3	58	25	+33	59	Qualification for the Championship round
2	Beitar Jerusalem	26	17	6	3	61	29	+32	57	Qualification for the Championship round
3	Maccabi Tel Aviv	26	14	7	5	55	32	+23	49	Qualification for the Championship round
4	Hapoel Tel Aviv	26	15	6	5	46	26	+20	49 (Note: Hapoel Tel Aviv had 2 points deducted following riot in Maccabi Tel Aviv match.)	Qualification for the Championship round
5	Maccabi Haifa	26	11	9	6	50	28	+22	42	Qualification for the Championship round

Source: Soccerway
Rules for classification: 1) Points; 2) Goal difference; 3) Matches won; 4) Goals scored; 5) Head-to-head points; 6) Head-to-head goal difference; 7) Head-to-head goals scored; 8) Play-off.

=== 2025–26 UEFA Europa League ===
Pos	Team	Pld	W	D	L	GF	GA	GD	Pts
32	(Scottish Football Association) Rangers	8	1	1	6	5	14	−9	4
33	(French Football Federation) Nice	8	1	0	7	7	15	−8	3
34	(Royal Dutch Football Association) Utrecht	8	0	1	7	5	15	−10	1
35	(Swedish Football Association) Malmö FF	8	0	1	7	4	15	−11	1
36	(Israel Football Association) Maccabi Tel Aviv	8	0	1	7	2	22	−20	1

Source: UEFA
Rules for classification: League phase tiebreakers

== Current squad ==
=== First team ===
As of 25 August 2026

No.	Pos.	Nation	Player
1	GK	ISR	Ofek Melika
2	DF	ENG	James Tavernier
5	DF	GUI	Mohamed Ali Camara
6	DF	NED	Tyrese Asante
9	FW	SLO	Ester Sokler
10	MF	VEN	Kervin Andrade
11	DF	ISR	Sagiv Yehezkel
13	DF	ISR	Raz Shlomo
14	DF	ISR	Denny Gropper
16	MF	ISR	Gabi Kanichowsky
17	MF	SRB	Kristijan Belić
18	MF	ISR	Dan Glazer
19	FW	ISR	Elad Madmon
22	DF	ISR	Noam Ben Harush

No.	Pos.	Nation	Player
23	FW	ISR	Ori Azo
25	DF	ISR	Shahar Rosen
28	MF	MLI	Issouf Sissokho
29	FW	CPV	Hélio Varela
30	MF	ISR	Itamar Noy
33	FW	ISR	Hisham Layous
36	MF	ISR	Ido Shahar
41	DF	ISR	Itay Ben Hemo
42	MF	ISR	Dor Peretz (captain)
51	GK	ISR	Shalev Sa'adia
60	FW	ISR	Ilay Ben Simon
77	MF	ISR	Osher Davida
90	GK	ISR	Roi Mishpati
98	FW	MDA	Ion Nicolaescu

=== Players Under Contrect ===
Note: Flags indicate national team as defined under FIFA eligibility rules; some limited exceptions apply. Players may hold more than one non-FIFA nationality.

No.	Pos.	Nation	Player
—	DF	ISR	Itay Malma
—	MF	ISR	Lior Mashansky
—	FW	ISR	Anis Porat Ayash

=== Retired numbers ===
- 8 (Israel) – Avi Nimni, Second striker (1990–97, 1998–03, 2005–08)
- 12 (Israel) – Meni Levi, Right back

=== Out on loan ===
No.	Pos.	Nation	Player
—	DF	BRA	Heitor (at (Hungary) Újpest until 30 June 2027)
—	DF	ISR	Amit Karadi (at (Israel) Bnei Sakhnin until 30 June 2027)
—	DF	ISR	Daniel Tishler (at (Israel) Hapoel Ramat Gan until 30 June 2027)
—	DF	ISR	Noam Schwarz (at (Israel) Hapoel Ramat Gan until 30 June 2027)
—	DF	ISR	Ron Feldman (at (Israel) Hapoel Kfar Shalem until 30 June 2027)
—	DF	ISR	Itay Barhum (at (Israel) Hapoel Kfar Shalem until 30 June 2027)
—	DF	ISR	Idan Weinberg (at (Israel) Hapoel Kfar Shalem until 30 June 2027)
—	MF	ISR	Ido Oli (at (Israel) Hapoel Ramat Gan until 30 June 2027)

No.	Pos.	Nation	Player
—	MF	ISR	Roy Nawi (at (Ukraine) Kryvbas Kryvyi Rih until 30 June 2027)
—	MF	ISR	Yali Danor (at (Israel) Hapoel Kfar Shalem until 30 June 2027)
—	MF	ISR	Ran Rival (at (Israel) Hapoel Kfar Shalem until 30 June 2027)
—	MF	ISR	Yoav Junio (at (Israel) Hapoel Kfar Shalem until 30 June 2027)
—	FW	ISR	Yehuda Balay (at (Israel) Hapoel Rishon LeZion until 30 June 2027)
—	FW	ISR	Itay Zafrani (at (Israel) Hapoel Haifa until 30 June 2027)
—	FW	ISR	Rom Savitch (at (Israel) Hapoel Kfar Shalem until 30 June 2027)
—	FW	ISR	Orel Baye (at (Israel) Hapoel Kfar Shalem until 30 June 2027)

=== Internationals 2025–26 ===
Only up to six non-Israeli nationals can be in an Israeli club squad (only five can play at the same time). Those with Jewish ancestry, married to an Israeli or have played in Israel for an extended period of time, can claim a passport or permanent residency which would allow them to play with Israeli status.

- (Guinea) Mohamed Ali Camara
- (Moldova) Ion Nicolaescu
- (Mali) Issouf Sissokho
- (Netherlands) Tyrese Asante
- (Serbia) Nemanja Stojić
- (Brazil) Heitor
- (Venezuela) Kervin Andrade
- (Cape Verde) Hélio Varela
- (Kosovo) Emir Sahiti

=== Youth team ===
No.	Pos.	Nation	Player
44	GK	ISR	Roei Amedi
45	GK	ISR	Shalev Sa'adia
46	DF	ISR	Dor Goldstein
47	MF	ISR	Yuval Kfir

No.	Pos.	Nation	Player
48	MF	ISR	Yoav Fleishman
49	MF	ISR	Mohammed Taha
52	FW	ISR	Nadav Haber

== Season by season ==
Season	Domestic						International	
Season	Tier	League	Pos.	State Cup	Toto Cup	Super Cup	International	
1928–29	x	x	x	Quarter-finals	x	x	—	—
1929–30	x	x	x	Champion	x	x	—	—
1930–31	x	x	x	Champion	x	x	—	—
1931–32	1	Eretz Israel League	5th place	x	x	x	—	—
1932–33	1	Eretz Israel League	x	First Round	x	x	—	—
1933–34	1	Eretz Israel League	5th place	Champion	x	x	—	—
1934–35	1	Eretz Israel League	5th place	Runner-Up	x	x	—	—
1935–36	1	Eretz Israel League	Champion	First round	x	x	—	—
1936–37	1	Eretz Israel League	x	x	x	x	—	—
1937–38	1	Eretz Israel League	Champion	Semi-finals	x	x	—	—
1938–39	1	Eretz Israel League	Runner-Up	Runner-Up	x	x	—	—
1939–40	1	Eretz Israel League	Champion	Semi-finals	x	x	—	—
1940–41	1	Eretz Israel League	3rd place	Runner-Up	x	x	—	—
1941–42	1	Eretz Israel League	Runner-Up	Champion	x	x	—	—
1942–43	1	Eretz Israel League	x	Semi-finals	x	x	—	—
1943–44	1	Eretz Israel League	4th place	Round of 16	x	x	—	—
1944–45	1	Eretz Israel League	4th place	Round of 16	x	x	—	—
1945–46	1	Eretz Israel League	x	x	x	x	—	—
1946–47	1	Eretz Israel League	Champion	Champion	x	x	—	—
1947–48	1	Eretz Israel League	Runner-Up	Champion	x	x	—	—
1948–49	1	Israeli League	x	x	x	x	—	—
1949–50	1	Israeli League	Champion	x	x	x	—	—
1950–51	1	Israeli League	x	x	x	x	—	—
1951–52	1	Liga Alef	Champion	Runner-Up	x	x	—	—
1952–53	1	Liga Alef	x	x	x	x	—	—
1953–54	1	Liga Alef	Champion	Champion	x	x	—	—
1954–55	1	Liga Alef	Runner-Up	Champion	x	x	—	—
1955–56	1	Liga Leumit	Champion	x	x	x	—	—
1956–57	1	Liga Leumit	3rd place	Semi-finals	x	—	—	—
1957–58	1	Liga Leumit	Champion	Champion	x	x	—	—
1958–59	1	Liga Leumit	3rd place	Champion	x	x	—	—
1959–60	1	Liga Leumit	Runner-Up	x	x	x	—	—
1960–61	1	Liga Leumit	4th place	Round of 16	x	x	—	—
1961–62	1	Liga Leumit	10th place	Runner-Up	x	—	—	—
1962–63	1	Liga Leumit	7th place	Round of 16	x	x	—	—
1963–64	1	Liga Leumit	5th place	Champion	x	x	—	—
1964–65	1	Liga Leumit	4th place	Champion	x	Champion	—	—
1965–66	1	Liga Leumit	Runner-Up	Quarter-finals	x	—	—	—
1966–67	1	Liga Leumit	Champion	Champion	x	x	—	—
1967–68	1	Liga Leumit	Champion	Round of 16	x	Champion	—	—
1968–69	1	Liga Leumit	Runner-Up	Semi-finals	x	—	1 Asian Champion Club Tournament — Champion	—
1969–70	1	Liga Leumit	Champion	Champion	x	Runner-Up	—	—
1970–71	1	Liga Leumit	10th place	Semi-finals	x	—	1 Asian Champion Club Tournament — Champion	—
1971–72	1	Liga Leumit	Champion	Semi-finals	x	x	—	—
1972–73	1	Liga Leumit	4th place	Quarter-finals	x	x	—	—
1973–74	1	Liga Leumit	Runner-Up	Semi-finals	x	—	—	—
1974–75	1	Liga Leumit	4th place	Round of 32	x	—	—	—
1975–76	1	Liga Leumit	7th place	Runner-Up	x	—	—	—
1976–77	1	Liga Leumit	Champion	Champion	x	Champion	—	—
1977–78	1	Liga Leumit	3rd place	Round of 16	x	—	—	—
1978–79	1	Liga Leumit	Champion	Runner-Up	x	Champion	—	—
1979–80	1	Liga Leumit	5th place	Quarter-finals	x	—	—	—
1980–81	1	Liga Leumit	8th place	Round of 32	x	—	—	—
1981–82	1	Liga Leumit	8th place	Round of 16	x	—	—	—
1982–83	1	Liga Leumit	5th place	Runner-Up	x	—	—	—
1983–84	1	Liga Leumit	5th place	Semi-finals	x	—	—	—
1984–85	1	Liga Leumit	7th place	Round of 16	Group stage	—	—	—
1985–86	1	Liga Leumit	3rd place	Semi-finals	Semi-finals	—	—	—
1986–87	1	Liga Leumit	3rd place	Champion	Semi-finals	x	—	—
1987–88	1	Liga Leumit	12th place	Champion	Group stage	Champion	—	—
1988–89	1	Liga Leumit	8th place	Round of 16		—	—	—
1989–90	1	Liga Leumit	4th place	Round of 16		—	—	—
1990–91	1	Liga Leumit	5th place	Round of 16		x	—	—
1991–92	1	Liga Leumit	Champion	Runner-Up	Runner-Up	x	—	—
1992–93	1	Liga Leumit	Runner-Up	Runner-Up	Champion	x	1 UEFA Champions League — First Round	—
1993–94	1	Liga Leumit	Runner-Up	Champion		x	—	—
1994–95	1	Liga Leumit	Champion	Round of 16		x	—	2 UEFA Cup Winners' Cup — First Round
1995–96	1	Liga Leumit	Champion	Champion		x	1 UEFA Champions League — Q	—
1996–97	1	Liga Leumit	6th place	Runner-Up	Semi-finals	x	1 UEFA Champions League — Q	3 UEFA Cup — First Round
1997–98	1	Liga Leumit	6th place	Round of 16		x	—	—
1998–99	1	Liga Leumit	Runner-Up	Round of 16	Champion	x	—	—
1999–2000	1	Israeli Premier League	6th place	Round of 16	Round of 16	x	—	3 UEFA Cup — First Round
2000–01	1	Israeli Premier League	4th place	Champion	Round of 16	x	—	—
2001–02	1	Israeli Premier League	3rd place	Champion	Semi-finals	x	—	2 UEFA Cup — Second Round
2002–03	1	Israeli Premier League	Champion	Semi-finals	Semi-finals	x	—	2 UEFA Cup — First Round
2003–04	1	Israeli Premier League	Runner-Up	Quarter-finals	Group stage	x	1 UEFA Champions League — Q2	—
2004–05	1	Israeli Premier League	8th place	Champion	Quarter-finals	x	1 UEFA Champions League — Group stage	—
2005–06	1	Israeli Premier League	6th place	Round of 16	Semi-finals	x	—	2 UEFA Cup — Q2
2006–07	1	Israeli Premier League	3rd place	Round of 16	Group stage	x	—	—
2007–08	1	Israeli Premier League	6th place	Round of 32	Quarter-finals	x	—	2 UEFA Cup — Q2
2008–09	1	Israeli Premier League	6th place	Round of 32	Champion	x	—	—
2009–10	1	Israeli Premier League	3rd place	Round of 16	Semi-finals	x	—	—
2010–11	1	Israeli Premier League	3rd place	Round of 32	Semi-finals	x	—	2 UEFA Europa League — PO
2011–12	1	Israeli Premier League	6th place	Round of 32	Quarter-finals	x	—	2 UEFA Europa League — Group stage
2012–13	1	Israeli Premier League	Champion	Round of 16	Quarter-finals	x	—	—
2013–14	1	Israeli Premier League	Champion	Round of 32	x	x	1 UEFA Champions League — Q3	2 UEFA Europa League — Round of 32
2014–15	1	Israeli Premier League	Champion	Champion	Champion	x	1 UEFA Champions League — Q3	2 UEFA Europa League — PO
2015–16	1	Israeli Premier League	Runner-Up	Runner-Up	Group stage	Runner-Up	1 UEFA Champions League — Group stage	—
2016–17	1	Israeli Premier League	Runner-Up	Runner-Up	Quarter-finals	—	—	2 UEFA Europa League — Group stage
2017–18	1	Israeli Premier League	Runner-Up	Round of 16	Champion	—	—	2 UEFA Europa League — Group stage
2018–19	1	Israeli Premier League	Champion	Semi-finals	Champion	—	—	2 UEFA Europa League — PO
2019–20	1	Israeli Premier League	Champion	Round of 32	Runner-Up	Champion	1 UEFA Champions League — Q2	2 UEFA Europa League — Q3
2020–21	1	Israeli Premier League	Runner-Up	Champion	Champion	Champion	1 UEFA Champions League — PO	2 UEFA Europa League — Round of 32
2021–22	1	Israeli Premier League	3rd place	Semi-finals	6th place	Runner-Up	—	3 UEFA Europa Conference League — Knockout round play-offs
2022–23	1	Israeli Premier League	3rd place	Semi-finals	7th place	—	—	3 UEFA Europa Conference League — PO
2023–24	1	Israeli Premier League	Champion	Quarter-finals	Champion	—	—	3 UEFA Europa Conference League — Round of 16
2024–25	1	Israeli Premier League	Champion	Round of 16	Champion	Champion	1 UEFA Champions League — Q2	2 UEFA Europa League — League Phase
2025–26	1	Israeli Premier League	3rd place	Champion	5th place	Runner-up	1 UEFA Champions League — Q2	2 UEFA Europa League — League Phase
2026–27	1	Israeli Premier League	Ongoing	Ongoing	Ongoing	Champion	2 UEFA Europa League — Q3	3 UEFA Conference League — PO
Season	Tier	League	Pos.	State Cup	Toto Cup	Super Cup	International	
Season	Domestic						International	

- x — Wasn't held \ wasn't finished.
- (—) — Did not compete.
- Italic — Still competing.

== Honours ==
=== Domestic competitions ===
==== League ====
- Israeli Championships
  - Champions (26): 1935–36, 1937, 1939, 1941–42, 1946–47, 1966–68, 1969–70, 1971–72, 1976–77, 1978–79, 1991–92, 1994–95, 1995–96, 2002–03, 2012–13, 2013–14, 2014–15, 2018–19, 2019–20, 2023–24, 2024–25
  - Runners-up (13): 1954–55, 1959–60, 1965–66, 1968–69, 1973–74, 1992–93, 1993–94, 1998–99, 2003–04, 2015–16, 2016–17, 2017–18, 2020–21

==== Cups ====
- State Cup
  - Winners (25): 1929, 1930, 1933, 1941, 1946, 1947, 1953–54, 1954–55, 1957–58, 1958–59, 1963–64, 1964–65, 1966–67, 1969–70, 1976–77, 1986–87, 1987–88, 1993–94, 1995–96, 2000–01, 2001–02, 2004–05, 2014–15, 2020–21, 2025–26
  - Runners-up (13): 1934, 1938, 1940, 1951–52, 1961–62, 1975–76, 1978–79, 1982–83, 1991–92, 1992–93, 1996–97, 2015–16, 2016–17
- Toto Cup
  - Winners (9): 1992–93, 1998–99, 2008–09, 2014–15, 2017–18, 2018–19, 2020–21, 2023–24, 2024–25
  - Runners-up (4): 1991–92, 1994–95, 1997–98, 2019–20
- Israel Super Cup
  - Winners (9): 1965, 1968, 1977, 1979, 1988, 2019, 2020, 2024, 2026
  - Runners-up (4): 1970, 2015, 2021, 2025
- Lilian Cup
  - Winners (2): 1985–86, 1986–87

=== European competitions ===
- UEFA Champions League
  - Group stage: 2004–05, 2015–16
- UEFA Europa League
  - Round of 32: 2013–14, 2020–21
  - League phase: 2024–25, 2025–26
  - Group stage: 2011–12, 2016–17, 2017–18
  - Second round: 2001–02
  - First round: 1996–97, 1999–2000, 2002–03
- UEFA Europa Conference League
  - Round of 16: 2023–24
  - Knockout round play-offs: 2021–22

=== Asian competitions ===
- AFC Champions League Elite / Asian Champion Club Tournament
  - Winners (2): 1969, 1971

==== Israeli championships number ====
There was controversy regarding the number of championships the team won prior to the establishment of the State of Israel in 1948.

According to the official lists of the Israel Football Association, Maccabi won four pre-1948 championships for 23 total championships, while according to the team's records, Maccabi won five pre-1948 championships and 24 total championships.

This discrepancy stems from the title won by Maccabi Tel Aviv in the 1939 season: the Tel Aviv District League, in which Maccabi Tel Aviv played and won the district championship, was the strongest of the three district leagues that season.

The controversy arises in regards to two points:

- Firstly, was this title recognized as a national championship at the time?
- Secondly, should this title be recognized as a national championship today?

In 2024, the controversy was resolved after the Israel Football Association recognized the team's 1939 championship as an official championship.

== Records ==
- Seasons in top division – 69 (1949–present), (only team that has never been relegated)
- Lowest league position – 12 (1987–88)
- Domestic treble – 2014–15 (League, State Cup and Toto Cup)
- Double seasons – 7 (1946–47, 1953–54, 1957–58, 1969–1970, 1976–77, 1995–96, 2014–15)
- Invincible seasons – 2 (1953–54, 1957–58), (no losses in the league and the State Cup)
- Biggest 'undefeated' streak in the league – 44 matches (11/10/51 – 03/05/55)
- Biggest 'undefeated away matches' streak in the league – 34 (07/16/49 – 03/05/55)
- Win record for season – 30 (1966–68)
- Loss record for season – 14 (2007–08, 2011–12)
- Most points in a season – 89 (2018–2019)
- Most 'league goals for' in a season (club) – 103 (1949–50)
- Most 'league goals against' in a season (club) – 53 (1990–91)
- Lowest number of 'league goals against' in a season (club) – 10 (2019–20)
- Most league goals differential in a season (club) – 85 (1949–50), (103–18)
- All time League goals – 3114 (since 1948)
- Biggest 'no goals against' streak in league matches – 730 minutes (2014–15)
- Biggest 'league matches won' streak since season start – 11 (1993–94)
- Highest point lead above runner-up in the end of the season – 31 (2018–19)
- Most goals in a season (player) – 35, Eran Zahavi, 2015–16
- Biggest win – 13–0 vs Maccabi Rishon LeZion, 1950
- Biggest defeat – 10–0 vs Maccabi Haifa, 1988
- Biggest home win – 13–0 vs Maccabi Rishon LeZion, 1950
- Biggest home defeat – 4–0 vs Hapoel Acre, 2006
- Biggest away win – 7–0 vs Hapoel Haifa, 1994
- Biggest away defeat – 10–0 vs Maccabi Haifa, 1988
- Biggest win in UEFA Competitions – 6–0 vs FK Žalgiris (2001) and Željezničar (2011)
- Biggest defeat in UEFA Competitions – 5–1 vs Bayern Munich (2004) and Beşiktaş (2011)
- All-time top scorer – Avi Nimni, 174
- All-time most appearances – Menachem Bello, 498

== Staff ==
=== Management ===
Position	Staff
Owner	(Canada) Mitchell Goldhar
Chairman	(Cyprus) Jack Angelides
CEO	(England) Ben Mansford

Last updated: 14 June 2017
Source: F.C. Maccabi Tel Aviv Official Website

=== First team staff ===
Position	Staff
Technical Director	(England) Dominic Price
Head Coach	(Norway) Ronny Deila
Assistant Head Coach	(Scotland) Kenny Miller
Assistant Head Coach	(Norway) Kenneth Dokken
Sport Science	(Israel) Ilan Richardson
Fitness Coach	(Israel) Yossi Zigdon
Analyst	(Israel) Avram Neuburg
Scouting	(Israel) Liran Gindi

Last updated: 1 February 2026
Source: F.C. Maccabi Tel Aviv Official Website

=== Youth division ===
Position	Staff
Academy Director	(Portugal) Claudio Braga
Director of Sports Science	(Israel) Ilan Richardson
Assistant Academy Director	(Israel) Yitzhak Goldberg
General Manager	(Israel) Guy Zukerman
U-19 Head Coach	(Israel) Michael Zandberg
U-19 Assistant Coach	(Israel) Shaul De-chukrel
Goalkeeping Coach	(Israel) Alexander Uvarov
Team Manager	(Israel) Eliel Horovits
Physiotherapist	(Israel) Or Aharon
Youth Department Secretary	(Israel) Limor Ben Aharon

Last updated: 29 November 2016
Source: F.C. Maccabi Tel Aviv Official Website

=== Logistical staff ===
Position	Staff
First Team Manager	(Israel) Yoav Ziv
Kit Man	(Israel) Itay Shlaifer
Kit Man	(Israel) Raviv Dakar

Last updated: 18 August 2015
Source: F.C. Maccabi Tel Aviv Official Website

=== Medical staff ===
Position	Staff
Head of Medical Services	(Israel) Dr. Dror Lindner
Physiotherapist	(Israel) Amiram Muyal
Physiotherapist	(Israel) Yoni Hernovitz
Physiotherapist	(Israel) Ronen Levi
Physiotherapist	(Israel) Snir Konik
Masseur	(Israel) Ofir Mann

Last updated: 18 August 2015
Source: F.C. Maccabi Tel Aviv Official Website

== Managerial history ==
- (France) Emanuel Gur-Arie (1910s)
- (Poland) Shimon Ratner (192?–34)
- (Austria) Egon Pollack (1934–39)
- (Germany) Armin Weiss (1939–41)
- (Austria) Egon Pollack (1941–47)
- (Israel) Jerry Beit haLevi (1947–52)
- (Israel) Gaul Mechlis (1952–53)
- (Israel) Jerry Beit haLevi (1953–57)
- (Israel) Yosef Tessler (1957–59)
- (Israel) Yosef Merimovich (1959–61)
- (Hungary) Ignac Molnár (1961–62)
- Israel Halivner (1962–62)
- (Israel) Slabolo Stankovic & (Israel) Jerry Beit haLevi (1962–64)
- (Israel) Eliezer Spiegel (1966–67)
- (Israel) Zvi Erlich (1967–67)
- Israel Halivner (1967–68)
- (Israel) Yosef Merimovich (1968–69)
- (Israel) David Schweitzer (1969–70)
- Israel Halivner (1970–71)
- (Israel) Itzhak Schneor (1971–72)
- (Israel) Yosef Merimovich (1972–73)
- (Israel) Itzhak Schneor (1973–76)
- (Israel) Ya'akov Grundman (1976–78)
- (Israel) Nissim Bachar (1978–79)
- (Israel) Zvi Rozen (1979–80)
- (Israel) Ze'ev Seltzer (1980–81)
- (Israel) Ya'akov Grundman (1981–82)
- (Israel) Nissim Bachar (1982–83)
- (Israel) David Schweitzer (1983–85)
- (Israel) Itzhak Schneor (1983–85)
- (Israel) Shimon Shenhar (1985–87)
- (Israel) Giora Spiegel & (Israel) Dror Bar-Nur (1987–88)
- (Israel) Yosef Merimovich (1988–89)
- (Israel) Nissim Bachar (1989–90)
- (Israel) Zvi Rosen (1990–91)
- (Israel) Avram Grant (1 July 1991 – 30 June 1995)
- (Israel) Dror Kashtan (1 July 1995 – 30 June 1996)
- (Israel) Avram Grant (1 July 1996 – 30 June 2000)
- (Israel) Shlomo Sharf (2000)
- (Israel) Nir Levine (2000–02)
- (Israel) Nir Klinger (1 July 2002 – 5 December 2005)
- (Netherlands) Ton Caanen (25 Dec 2005 – 30 May 2006)
- (Israel) Eli Cohen (2006–07)
- (Israel) Nir Levine (2007–08)
- (Israel) Ran Ben Shimon (2008)
- (Israel) Marco Balbul coach under (Israel) Avi Nimni (1 July 2008 – 21 October 2009)
- (Israel) Nir Levine coach under (Israel) Avi Nimni (2009–10)
- (Israel) Yossi Mizrahi coach under (Israel) Avi Nimni (1 July 2010 – 4 January 2011)
- (Israel) Motti Ivanir (10 Jan 2011 – 6 December 2011)
- (Israel) Nir Levine (caretaker) (12 Dec 2011 – 13 May 2012)
- (Spain) Óscar García (23 June 2012 – 22 May 2013)
- (Portugal) Paulo Sousa (12 June 2013 – 27 May 2014)
- (Spain) Óscar García (2 June 2014 – 26 August 2014)
- (Spain) Pako Ayestarán (26 Aug 2014 – 1 June 2015)
- (Serbia) Slaviša Jokanović (14 June 2015 – 27 December 2015)
- (Netherlands) Peter Bosz (4 Jan 2016 – 24 May 2016)
- (Georgia (country)) Shota Arveladze (16 June 2016 – 4 January 2017)
- (Angola) Lito Vidigal (11 February 2017 – 13 June 2017)
- (Netherlands) Jordi Cruyff (14 June 2017 – 31 May 2018)
- (Serbia) Vladimir Ivić (31 May 2018 – 6 July 2020)
- (Greece) Georgios Donis (11 August 2020 – 23 December 2020)
- (Netherlands) Patrick van Leeuwen (24 December 2020 – 26 October 2021)
- (Serbia) Mladen Krstajić (9 December 2021 – 24 May 2022)
- (Serbia) Vladimir Ivić (12 June 2022 – 3 January 2023)
- (Spain) Aitor Karanka (4 January 2023 – 25 June 2023)
- (Republic of Ireland) Robbie Keane (26 June 2023 – 7 June 2024)
- (Serbia) Žarko Lazetić (24 June 2024 – )

== See also ==
- Maccabi Tel Aviv F.C. in international football
- Maccabi Tel Aviv F.C. players

Achievements
Preceded by Hapoel Tel Aviv (Israel)	Champions of Asia; 1969	Succeeded by Taj (Iran)
Preceded by Taj (Iran)	Champions of Asia; 1971	Succeeded by Daewoo Royals (South Korea)
