= Israel Halivner =

Israeli footballer and manager

Israel Halivner ישראל חליבנר
Personal information
- Full name: Israel "Halaula" Halivner
- Date of birth: 10 January 1928
- Place of birth: Poland
- Date of death: 11 December 2013 (aged 85)
- Place of death: Givatayim, Israel
- Position: Midfielder

Youth career
- 1940–1948: Maccabi Tel Aviv

Senior career*
| Years | Team | Apps | (Gls) |
| 1948–1956 | Maccabi Tel Aviv | | |
| 1957–1958 | Maccabi Ramat Gan | | |

Managerial career
- 1957–1958: Maccabi Ramat Gan
- 1962: Maccabi Tel Aviv
- 1962–1964: Maccabi Sha'arayim
- 1964: Bnei Yehuda
- 1965: Maccabi Haifa
- 1966–1968: Maccabi Tel Aviv
- 1968–1970: Beitar Jerusalem
- 1970–1971: Maccabi Tel Aviv
- 1972–1973: Shimshon Tel Aviv
- 1975: Beitar Jerusalem
- 1975–1976: Hapoel Jerusalem
- * Club domestic league appearances and goals

Israel Halivner (Hebrew: ישראל חליבנר; 10 January 1928-11 December 2013) was a former Israeli footballer, who played for Maccabi Tel Aviv, and football manager. He was the head coach of Maccabi Tel Aviv when the club won its second Asian Club Championship.

== Career ==
=== Playing career ===
Halivner joined Maccabi Tel Aviv at the age of 12, and won four championships and two cups during the 1950s. In 1957, Halivner moved to Maccabi Ramat Gan, where he served as coach as well as playing. In 1958, at the age of 30, Halivner retired from active play and returned to Maccabi Tel Aviv, to serve as coach for the youth team.

=== Managerial career ===
In 1962, as Halivner was still coaching Maccabi Tel Aviv's youth team, the club board decided to sack coach Ignác Molnár and to install Halivner as coach for the senior team. Halivner stayed as head coach until the end of the season, saved the team from relegation and coached the team in the cup final, losing to Maccabi Haifa in a replay.

Halivner next took managerial positions in Maccabi Sha'arayim (where he led the team to promotion to Liga Leumit), Bnei Yehuda and Maccabi Haifa, before returning to Maccabi Tel Aviv as head coach for at the beginning of the double season. The club won the championship and qualified to the Asian Club Championship, but Halivner moved on to coach Beitar Jerusalem. In 1970 Halivner returned to Maccabi Tel Aviv and guided the club to its second Asian Club Championship title, as well as its 14th cup (as the previous season's cup played out in the first half of the season). However, poor results in the league and the new cup competition led Halivner to leave the post. Halivner coached Shimshon Tel Aviv, Beitar Jerusalem and Hapoel Jerusalem, but late retired from coaching altogether to concentrate on running his family's travel agency business.

== Honours ==
=== As player ===
- League Championship (4):
  - 1949–50, 1951–52, 1953–54, 1955–56
- Israel State Cup (2):
  - 1954, 1955

=== As Manager ===
- Asian Club Championship (1):
  - 1971
- League Championship (1):
  - Liga Leumit
- Israel State Cup (1):
  - 1970
