= Motti Ivanir =

Israeli footballer and manager

Personal information
- Full name: Mordechai Ivanir
- Date of birth: March 18, 1964 (age 62)
- Place of birth: Tel Aviv, Israel
- Position: Midfielder

Team information
- Current team: Hapoel Nof HaGalil

Senior career*
Years	Team	Apps	(Gls)
1981–1986	Maccabi Tel Aviv	162	(33)
1986–1988	Roda JC	27	(3)
1988–1990	Maccabi Tel Aviv	65	(10)
1990–1991	Maccabi Netanya	22	(10)
1991–1992	Bnei Yehuda	29	(11)
1992	Hapoel Haifa	12	(2)
1992–1993	Hapoel Petah Tikva	17	(1)
1993–1994	Ironi Ashdod	29	(3)
1994–1995	Shimshon Tel Aviv	21	(3)
1995–1996	Tzafririm Holon	7	(0)

International career
1986–1992	Israel	18	(1)

Managerial career
- 1997–1999: Beitar Be'er Sheva
- 1999: Maccabi Netanya
- 2000: Hapoel Be'er Sheva
- 2000–2001: Hapoel Kfar Saba
- 2001–2002: Hapoel Ramat Gan
- 2002: Hakoah Ramat Gan
- 2002–2003: Beitar Be'er Sheva
- 2003–2006: Hapoel Nazareth Illit
- 2006–2008: Israel U17
- 2008–2010: Israel U21
- 2011: Maccabi Tel Aviv
- 2013–2014: Hapoel Be'er Sheva (youth)
- 2016: Hapoel Ironi Kiryat Shmona
- 2017: Hapoel Tel Aviv
- 2017–2018: FK Olympia Prague
- 2019: Maccabi Ahi Nazareth
- 2019–2020: Hapoel Ashkelon
- 2020–2021: Hapoel Umm al-Fahm
- 2021–2022: Hapoel Umm al-Fahm
- 2023: Hapoel Nof HaGalil
- 2024–: Hapoel Nof HaGalil
- * Club domestic league appearances and goals

Motti Ivanir (Hebrew: מוטי איוניר; born March 18, 1964) is a former footballer mostly known for his time in Maccabi Tel Aviv, being the first Israeli to play in the Eredivisie and representing Israel at the national level. Ivanir, who now works as a manager, is currently managing Hapoel Nof HaGalil at Liga Leumit.

== Playing career ==
=== Club ===
Ivanir became the first professional Israeli footballer in the Netherlands when he joined Roda JC in 1986.

=== International ===
He made his senior debut for Israel in a January 1986 friendly match against Finland and has earned a total of 18 caps, scoring one goal. His final international was an April 1992 friendly against Iceland.

== Honours ==
=== As a Player ===
- Israel State Cup:
  - Winner (1): 1988
- Toto Cup:
  - Winner (1): 1991–92
- Israeli Premier League:
  - Runner-up (1): 1991-92

=== As a Manager ===
- Liga Leumit:
  - Runner-up (1): 2003–04
