= Benny Tabak =

Israeli footballer

Benny Tabak בני טבק
Personal information
- Full name: Binyamin Tabak
- Date of birth: June 7, 1956 (age 70)
- Place of birth: Ness Ziona, Israel
- Position: Striker

Team information
- Current team: Hapoel Herzliya

Senior career*
Years	Team	Apps	(Gls)
1972–1989	Maccabi Tel Aviv	390	(118)
1984–1985	→ Kansas City Comets (loan)	44	(18)
1989–1990	Maccabi Yavne	29	(19)
1990–1992	Maccabi Petah Tikva	52	(26)
1992–1993	Hapoel Kfar Saba	29	(15)
1993–1994	Maccabi Jaffa	5	(1)

International career
1976–1981	Israel	12	(5)

Managerial career
- 1996–1997: Israel U-16
- 1997: Hapoel Be'er Sheva
- 2000–2001: Ironi Kiryat Shmona
- 2007–2008: Hapoel Ramat HaSharon
- 2010–2012: Hapoel Herzliya
- 2012–2013: Hapoel Ramat HaSharon
- 2013–2017: Maccabi Tel Aviv (team director)
- 2019: Hapoel Herzliya
- * Club domestic league appearances and goals

Benny Tabak (Hebrew: בני טבק; born 7 June 1956) is an Israeli coach and former footballer who is now coaching Hapoel Herzliya.

== Personal life ==
His father was Israeli Olympic runner David Tabak. He is Jewish.
