= Menachem Bello =

Israeli footballer

Miko Bello

Personal information
- Full name: Menachem Bello
- Date of birth: 26 December 1947 (age 78)
- Place of birth: Tel Aviv, Mandate Palestine
- Height: 1.68 m (5 ft 6 in)
- Position: Defender

Senior career*
Years	Team	Apps	(Gls)
1963–1982	Maccabi Tel Aviv	498	(1)

International career
1965–1975	Israel	57	(0)
- * Club domestic league appearances and goals

Menachem 'Miko' Bello (Hebrew: מנחם 'מיקו' בלו; born 26 December 1947) is a former Israeli football defender, who played for the Israel national team between 1965 and 1975. He was part of the Israel squad for the 1970 World Cup.

At club level, Bello played solely for Maccabi Tel Aviv
