= 1975 Israel Super Cup =

Hapoel Be'er Sheva	Hapoel Kfar Saba
2	1
- Date: 18 October 1975
- Venue: Vasermil Stadium, Be'er Sheva
- Referee: Yosef Finklestein
- Attendance: 7,000

The 1975 Israel Super Cup was the fifth Israel Super Cup (tenth, including unofficial matches, as the competition wasn't played within the Israel Football Association in its first 5 editions, until 1969), an annual Israel football match played between the winners of the previous season's Top Division and Israel State Cup.

The match was played between Hapoel Be'er Sheva, champions of the 1974–75 Liga Leumit and Hapoel Kfar Saba, winners of the 1974–75 Israel State Cup.

For both teams, this was their first appearance in the competition. At the match, played at Vasermil Stadium, Hapoel Be'er Sheva won 2–1.

== Match details ==
18 October 1975

Hapoel Be'er Sheva	2–1	Hapoel Kfar Saba
Barad 35'; Avitan 65'		Shum 74'

Vasermil Stadium, Be'er Sheva
Attendance: 7,000
Referee: Yosef Finklestein

Hapoel Be'er Sheva	Hapoel Kfar Saba

GK	(Israel) Roni Moskovich	Substituted off
RB	(Israel) Uri Binyamin
CB	(Israel) Alon Ben Dor
CB	(Israel) Robert Elbaz
LB	(Israel) Ya'akov Cohen
CM	(Israel) Eliyahu Offer
CM	(Israel) Avraham Numa
CM	(Israel) Rafi Eliyahu
FW	(Israel) Efraim Zvi
FW	(Israel) Meir Barad
FW	(Israel) Shalom Avitan
Substitutes:
GK	(Israel) Avner Mesika	Substituted in
Manager:
(Israel) Amatzia Levkovich

GK	(Israel) Yair Nosovski
RB	(Israel) Noah Einstein
DF	(Israel) Yoav Avrutski
DF	(Israel) Yoram Mor
LB	(Israel) Ariel Ben Arie
CM	(Israel) Avner Golasa
CM	(Israel) Itzhak Shum
CM	(Israel) Dori Almog	Substituted off
FW	(Israel) Eli Fuss	Substituted off
FW	Israel Fogel
FW	(Israel) Itzhak Rogak
Substitutes:
MF	(Israel) Yossi Driks	Substituted in
FW	(Israel) Ya'akov Ginzburg	Substituted in
Manager:
(Israel) Shlomo Sharf
