= 1976 Israel Super Cup =

Hapoel Be'er Sheva	Beitar Jerusalem
2	3
- Date: 11 September 1976
- Venue: Bloomfield Stadium, Tel Aviv
- Referee: Menachem Ashkenazi
- Attendance: 14,000

The 1976 Israel Super Cup was the sixth Israel Super Cup (11th, including unofficial matches, as the competition wasn't played within the Israel Football Association in its first 5 editions, until 1969), an annual Israel football match played between the winners of the previous season's Top Division and Israel State Cup.

The match was played between Hapoel Be'er Sheva, champions of the 1975–76 Liga Leumit and Beitar Jerusalem, winners of the 1975–76 Israel State Cup.

This was Hapoel Be'er Sheva's 2nd Israel Super Cup appearance and Beitar's first. At the match, played at Bloomfield Stadium, Beitar Jerusalem won 3–2, after extra time.

== Match details ==
11 September 1976
16:00

Hapoel Be'er Sheva	2–3 (a.e.t.)	Beitar Jerusalem
Eliyahu 32'; Abugzir 38'		Malmilian 18', 74' (pen.); Yishai 92'

Bloomfield Stadium, Tel Aviv
Attendance: 8,000
Referee: Avraham Klein

Hapoel Be'er Sheva	Beitar Jerusalem

GK	(Israel) Roni Moskovich
RB	(Israel) Uri Binyamin
CB	(Israel) Alon Ben Dor
LB	(Israel) Shlomo Ben David
CB	(Israel) Ya'akov Cohen
CM	(Israel) Eliyahu Offer	Substituted off
CM	(Israel) Moshe Abugzir
CM	(Israel) Rafi Eliyahu
FW	(Israel) Ovadia Zvi
FW	(Israel) Meir Barad
FW	(Israel) Avraham Numa
Substitutes:
MF	(Israel) Ofer Pulvernis	Substituted in
Manager:
(Israel) Eli Fuchs

GK	(Israel) Yossi Mizrahi
RB	(Israel) Yadid
DF	(Israel) Avraham Lev
DF	(Israel) Itzhak Jano
LB	(Israel) Yarkoni
CM	(Israel) Uri Malmilian
CM	(Israel) Danny Noyman (c)
CM	(Israel) Victor Levy	Substituted off
FW	(Israel) David Yishai
FW	(Israel) Shlomo Jerbi
FW	(Israel) Meir Azulai
Substitutes:
MF	(Israel) Yossi Avrahami	Substituted in
Manager:
(Israel) Yechiel Mor
