= Israeli Footballer of the Year =

Annual award

The title Footballer of the Year of Israel has been bestowed annually since 1960 by the Israeli newspaper Maariv at the end of each season. In the years 1963, 1966 and 1991 two players have been honoured. Mordechai Spiegler, who is considered the foremost player in Israeli football history, has between 1964 and 1971, been given the accolade a record four times.

== Winners ==
Year	Player	Club
2026	Kings Kangwa	Hapoel Be'er Sheva
2025	Dor Peretz	Maccabi Tel Aviv
2024	Eran Zahavi (T)	Maccabi Tel Aviv
2023	Omer Atzili (T)	Maccabi Haifa
2022	Omer Atzili (T)	Maccabi Haifa
2021	Josh Cohen (GK)	Maccabi Haifa
2020	Dan Glazer	Maccabi Tel Aviv
2019	Dor Micha	Maccabi Tel Aviv
2018	Hanan Maman	Hapoel Be'er Sheva
2017	Miguel Vitor	Hapoel Be'er Sheva
2016	Elyaniv Barda	Hapoel Be'er Sheva
2015	Eran Zahavi (T)	Maccabi Tel Aviv
2014	Eran Zahavi (T)	Maccabi Tel Aviv
2013	Eliran Atar (T)	Maccabi Tel Aviv
2012	Achmad Saba'a (T)	Maccabi Netanya
2011	Lior Rafaelov	Maccabi Haifa
2010	Gil Vermouth	Hapoel Tel Aviv
2009	Vincent Enyeama (GK)	Hapoel Tel Aviv
2008	Gal Alberman	Beitar Jerusalem
2007	Michael Zandberg	Beitar Jerusalem
2006	Gustavo Boccoli	Maccabi Haifa
2005	Idan Tal	Maccabi Haifa
2004	Nir Davidovich (GK)	Maccabi Haifa
2003	Baruch Dego	Maccabi Tel Aviv
2002	Đovani Roso	Maccabi Haifa
2001	Yossi Benayoun	Maccabi Haifa
2000	Shavit Elimeleh (GK)	Hapoel Tel Aviv
1999	Đovani Roso	Hapoel Haifa
1998	Yossi Abuksis	Beitar Jerusalem
1997	Eli Ohana	Beitar Jerusalem
1996	Haim Revivo (T)	Maccabi Haifa
1995	Haim Revivo (T)	Maccabi Haifa
1994	Eyal Berkovic	Maccabi Haifa
1993	Ronen Harazi	Beitar Jerusalem
1992	Avi Cohen II	Maccabi Tel Aviv
1991	Nir Levine (T); Tal Banin	Hapoel Petah Tikva; Maccabi Haifa
1990	Moshe Sinai	Bnei Yehuda Tel Aviv
1989	Nir Klinger	Maccabi Haifa
1988	Eli Cohen	Hapoel Tel Aviv
1987	Uri Malmilian	Beitar Jerusalem
1986	Avi Ran (GK)	Maccabi Haifa
1985	Moshe Selecter	Maccabi Haifa
1984	Eli Ohana	Beitar Jerusalem
1983	Oded Mahnes (T)	Maccabi Netanya
1982	Oded Mahnes (T)	Maccabi Netanya
1981	Moshe Sinai	Hapoel Tel Aviv
1980	Itzhak Vissoker (GK)	Maccabi Netanya
1979	Avi Cohen I	Maccabi Tel Aviv
1978	Oded Mahnes	Maccabi Netanya
1977	Shraga Topolansky	Beitar Tel Aviv
1976	Uri Malmilian	Beitar Jerusalem
1975	Uri Benjamin	Hapoel Be'er Sheva
1974	Ali Ottman	Hapoel Jerusalem
1973	Zvi Rosen	Maccabi Tel Aviv
1972	Abba Gindin	Hapoel Haifa
1971	Mordechai Spiegler	Maccabi Netanya
1970	Mordechai Spiegler	Maccabi Netanya
1969	Shmuel Rosenthal	Hapoel Petah Tikva
1968	Avraham Numa	Hapoel Be'er Sheva (season started in 1966)
1966	Shmuel Rosenthal; Mordechai Spiegler (T)	Hapoel Petah Tikva; Maccabi Netanya
1965	Haim Levin	Maccabi Tel Aviv
1964	Mordechai Spiegler	Maccabi Netanya
1963	Gideon Tish; Ya'akov Hodorov (GK)	Hapoel Tel Aviv; Hapoel Ramat Gan
1962	Shaul Matania	Maccabi Tel Aviv
1961	Amatzia Levkovich	Hapoel Tel Aviv
1960	Amatzia Levkovich	Hapoel Tel Aviv	T = also top scorer of the season GK = Goalkeeper
