= Alona Barkat =

Israeli businesswoman

- אלונה ברקת
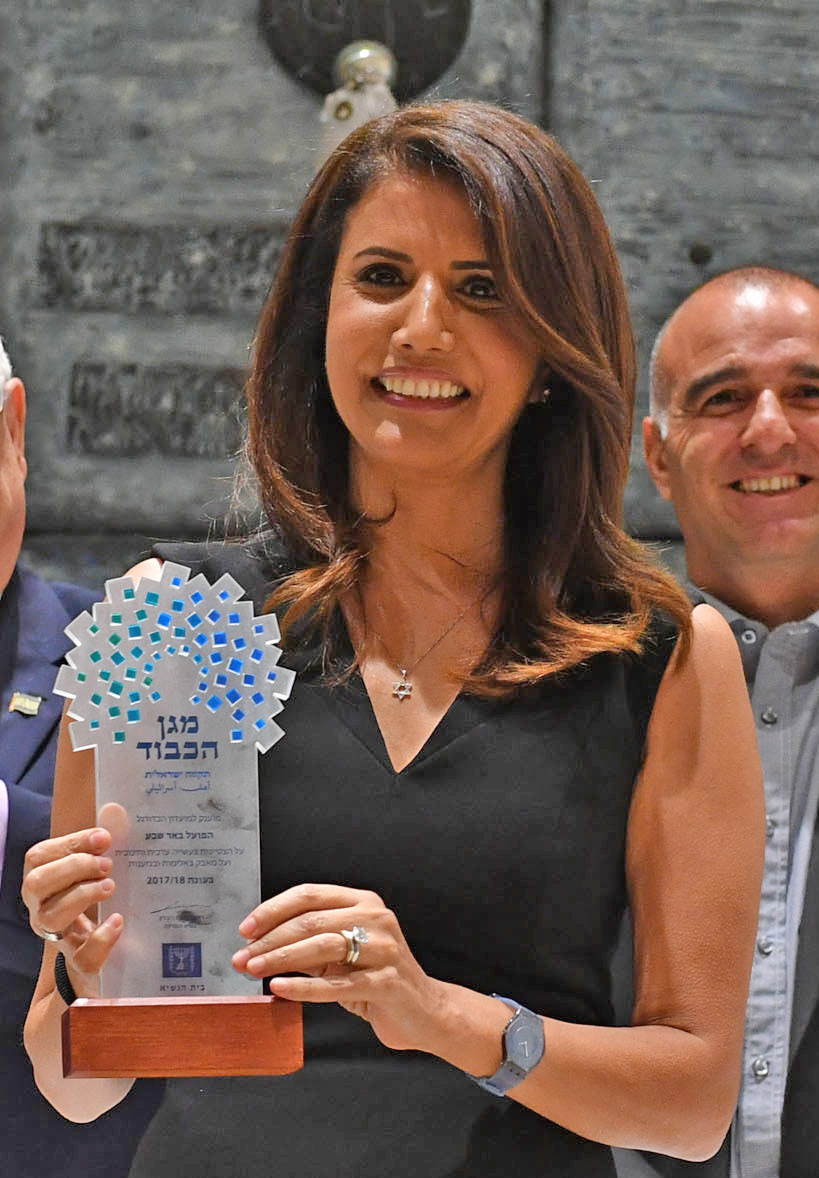
- Barkat awarded The Shield of Honor at the 2018 Israeli Hope ceremony
- Born: Alona Akwa; 24 June 1969 (age 57); Ashkelon, Israel
- Education: Hebrew University of Jerusalem
- Known for: Owner of Hapoel Be'er Sheva
- Relatives: Nir Barkat (brother-in-law)

Alona Barkat (Hebrew: אלונה ברקת; born 24 June 1969) is an Israeli businesswoman, and owner of the football team Hapoel Be'er Sheva.

== Biography ==
Alona Akwa (Hebrew: אלונה אקווע) was born and raised in Ashkelon, Israel, to Mizrahi Jewish (Yemenite-Jewish) parents. She is the eldest of four siblings. At the age of 14, Barkat moved to Jerusalem to attend a religious school for girls. Four years later, she returned to do national service (Sherut Leumi) in her hometown.

She then studied at the Hebrew University of Jerusalem, performing undergraduate and graduate studies in the history of the Middle East. During her studies, she met Eli Barkat, then a student in Mathematics and Computer Science, and her future husband.

In 1996, she moved to Silicon Valley in the United States with her husband, who became a businessman with his brother Nir Barkat. The Barkat brothers were early investors in Check Point, Backweb, eToro, and Oplus Technologies (sold to Intel), and set up the venture capital funds BRM and IVN (Israel Venture Network). In the eight years in which the family lived in the United States, Barkat started in the field of philanthropy. Among other things, the fund management company IVN also funded social projects, and has been active in organizations such as AIPAC and the Jewish Federation of San Francisco.

== Interest in sports ==
In 2004, she moved back to Israel with her family. Relations with the businessman Lonnie Herzikovic, then-owner of the football team Maccabi Tel Aviv, led her to consider entering a partnership with Maccabi Tel Aviv. She was involved in establishing a research institute at the University of Tel Aviv, together with the Rashi Foundation, where she met Eli Alaluf, CEO of the Fund at the time. Alaluf convinced her to buy the football team Hapoel Be'er Sheva, which played in the second division at the time.

== Hapoel Be'er Sheva ==
=== The first years ===
In the summer of 2007, just weeks before the opening of the season, the acquisition of the group from the previous owner, Eli Zino, was completed. Barkat became the first woman in Israel to own a football team. Barkat's management team put special emphasis on a youth department, educational activities, and community connection, supporting a number of specialized centers for children of disadvantaged communities and with intellectual disabilities, which receive sports training from personnel from the club itself. In March 2010, the group announced their departure at the end of the season, after a number of fans of the group tried to attack the coach, Guy Azouri. Two months later, after seeing a dramatic improvement in fan behavior, she announced that she had changed her mind, and that she intended to stay with the group.

=== Champions of the Israeli Premier League ===
In May 2016, the team won the Football League Championship in football. One of the biggest triumphs of the team in the Europa League was defeating 2–0 the Inter Milan on 15 September 2016; as a result, the German journal Bild dubbed her "the Angela Merkel of Football", due to being the first Israeli woman owning a football club, winning the premier league and scoring huge victories in the Europa League. The team has also won the 2016–2017 Championship, and the 2017–2018 Championship.

=== Departure and return ===
On 29 March 2020, Barkat announced she was leaving the club, after an agreement to reduce salaries by 30% with the team players due to the COVID-19 pandemic could not be reached, as part of a plan devised to address the expected losses in the 2019–2020 season and transferred all management rights to her attorney, Itzhak Younger. However, by February 2021, she returned to lead the team.

== Political career ==
In February 2019, Barkat announced she was joining the right-wing New Right party, and will run for the 2019 parliamentary elections. She has received the third spot on the party's list. However, she was not elected to the Knesset after New Right did not cross the electoral threshold in the April 2019 legislative elections.

== Personal life ==
She resides in Tel Aviv along with her husband Eli Barkat, and their three children. According to Forbes, Barkat's fortune in 2019 was estimated at NIS 460 million, the second richest politician in the country after her brother-in-law Nir Barkat.

== See also ==
- List of Jews in sports (non-players)
- List of Israelis
