= Shimon Shenhar =

Israeli footballer (1942–2012)

Shimon Shenhar שמעון שנהר
Personal information
- Date of birth: 19 September 1942
- Place of birth: Israel
- Date of death: 11 March 2012 (aged 69)
- Place of death: Israel

Senior career*
Years	Team	Apps	(Gls)
- Maccabi Hadera
1961–1968	Maccabi Haifa		

Managerial career
- 1975–1976: Beitar Haifa
- 1976–1977: Maccabi Haifa
- 1978: Hapoel Acre
- 1978–1979: Beitar Jerusalem
- 1980: Hapoel Petah Tikva
- 1980: Hapoel Haifa
- 1981–1983: Hapoel Be'er Sheva
- 1983–1985: Shimshon Tel Aviv
- 1985–1987: Maccabi Tel Aviv
- 1987–1988: Hapoel Kfar Saba
- 1988–1989: Hapoel Be'er Sheva
- 1990: Hapoel Tel Aviv
- 1998–1999: Hapoel Kfar Saba
- 1999–2000: Shimshon Tel Aviv
- 2000–2001: Federated States of Micronesia
- * Club domestic league appearances and goals

Shimon Shenhar (Hebrew: שמעון שנהר; 19 September 1942 – 11 March 2012) was an Israeli football player and manager.

== Early life ==
Shenhar was the son of Israeli footballer Otto Schlefenberg.

== Career ==
After managing teams in Israel, Shenhar was appointed manager of the Federated States of Micronesia national football team, where he was described as a "local hero" and helped set up the Micronesia president's visit to Israel as well as help secure the release of an Israeli woman held in a Micronesian prison, with the Foreign Ministry claiming that a number of Micronesia's United Nations votes in favor of Israel could be attributed to Shenhar. He was also described as "authoritarian style clashed with local customs".

== Personal life ==
Shenhar was married and had four children.
