= Nir Klinger =

Israeli footballer and manager

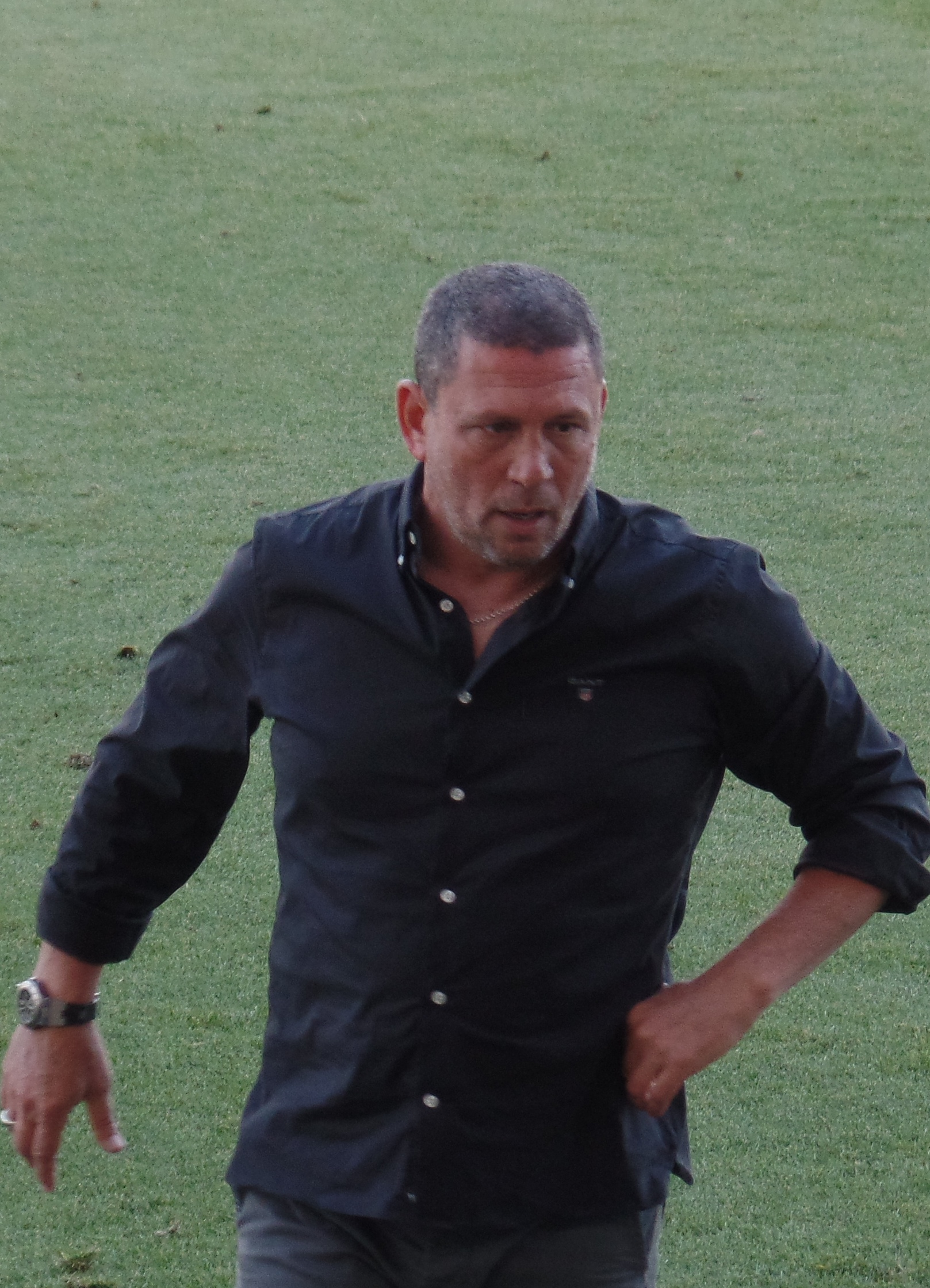
- Klinger in 2018

Personal information
- Date of birth: 25 May 1966 (age 60)
- Place of birth: Haifa, Israel
- Position: Defender

Youth career
- 1977–1984: Maccabi Haifa

Senior career*
Years	Team	Apps	(Gls)
1984–1990	Maccabi Haifa	136	(16)
1990–1998	Maccabi Tel Aviv	220	(26)

International career
1987–1997	Israel	83	(2)

Managerial career
- 1998–2000: Maccabi Tel Aviv (assistant)
- 2000–2002: Beitar Be'er Sheva
- 2002–2005: Maccabi Tel Aviv
- 2006–2007: Enosis Neon Paralimni
- 2007–2008: AEK Larnaca
- 2008–2009: AEP Paphos
- 2009: AEL Limassol
- 2009–2010: Nea Salamina
- 2010–2011: Hapoel Be'er Sheva
- 2012: Enosis Neon Paralimni
- 2012–2013: Hapoel Haifa
- 2013–2015: FC Ashdod
- 2015–2016: Maccabi Sha'arayim (general manager)
- 2016: Maccabi Sha'arayim
- 2016: Hapoel Haifa (general manager)
- 2017–2018: Hapoel Haifa
- 2018–2019: Beitar Jerusalem
- 2019–2021: Hapoel Tel Aviv
- 2021–2022: Maccabi Petah Tikva
- 2022: Hapoel Haifa
- * Club domestic league appearances and goals

Nir Klinger (Hebrew: ניר קלינגר; born 25 May 1966) is an Israeli football coach and former player.

During the 1990s, Klinger served as Captain for Maccabi Tel Aviv and the Israel national football team.

He was the coach of Maccabi Tel Aviv for three seasons, before resigning under pressure on 5 December 2005. As coach of Maccabi, Klinger won the Israeli championship and an Israeli state cup.

== Playing career ==
=== Club ===
A product of the Maccabi Haifa youth team, he was a defensive player. He made his league debut for Maccabi on 3 November 1984 against Hakoah Ramat Gan, when he came on as a substitute in the 80th minute.

He spent six seasons with Maccabi Haifa before moving to Maccabi Tel Aviv for eight seasons. He won two Israeli championships with Maccabi Haifa and three championships and another two Israel State Cup with Maccabi Tel Aviv.

He retired due to injury during the 1997–98 season.

=== International ===
Klinger made his debut for Israel on 18 February 1987 in a 1–1 draw with Northern Ireland. He scored his first goal against Wales in a 3–3 draw on 8 February 1989. His last appearance was on 31 March 1997 in a 3–0 win over Luxembourg.

In total, Klinger played 83 caps for the Israel national team between 1987 and 1997, and captained the team from August 1992 until March 1997.

== Managerial career ==
In 1998 Klinger was appointed assistant to Avram Grant at Maccabi Tel Aviv. In 2000, he became manager of second division Beitar Be'er Sheva, leading them to third place (their highest ever position).

In 2002, he left the club to return to Maccabi as manager. In his first season Maccabi won the title. They finished runners-up the following year, and won the State Cup in 2004–05. On 5 December 2005 he resigned as manager.

Klinger led Maccabi Tel Aviv to the UEFA Champions League group stage in the 2004–05 season as a manager, as the team beat HJK Helsinki and PAOK Thessaloniki in the qualifying rounds. Maccabi played against former European champions: Juventus, Ajax Amsterdam and Bayern Munchen. Maccabi managed to get one victory over Ajax Amsterdam 2–1 and held Juventus into a draw, 1–1.

In 2006, he was appointed manager of Cypriot club Enosis Neon Paralimni, but resigned in September 2007. Soon afterward, he was appointed manager of AEK Larnaca, but was fired in October 2008 after poor start of the season. He finished with Paralimni and Aek in the 4–5 place in the Cypriot premier league.

In the 2008–09 season he was appointed manager of newly promoted AEP Paphos and under his management the team was able to avoid relegation.

On 24 May 2009, Klinger signed a three-year contract with AEL Limassol.

While managing AEL Limassol, a crucial derby match against Anorthosis Famagusta fell on the Jewish holiday, Yom Kippur. Klinger, who defines himself as a faithful Jew, advised the club's management of the importance of the holiday and that he would miss the match along with his assistant, Felix Naim, who was also Jewish. The club tried to have the match moved to accommodate them.

On 23 May 2012, Klinger was appointed the manager of Hapoel Haifa., and brought the team to a ninth -place finish.

On 19 May 2013, Kilinger was appointed the manager of F.C. Ashdod. He was sacked following the 2014–15 season, after the team was relegated to the second-tier Liga Leumit.

On 15 November 2015, Kilinger was appointed the general manager of Maccabi Sha'arayim, a club from Liga Alef (third tier), he signed a contract for three years. On 22 November 2016, he was appointed as the manager of the club while Salim Tuama got the job as his assistant. On 6 December 2016, Klinger decided to leave Sha'arayim, and became the general manager of Hapoel Haifa

== Honours ==
=== As player ===
- Israeli Premier League: 1984–85, 1988–89, 1991–92, 1994–95, 1995–96
- Israel State Cup: 1993–94, 1995–96
- Toto Cup: 1992–93
- Member of the Israeli Football Hall of Fame (2009)
- Israeli Footballer of the Year : 1989

=== As manager ===
- Israeli Premier League: 2002–03
- Israel State Cup: 2005, 2018
- Toto Cup: 2012–13
- Toto Cup (Leumit): 2016
