= Haim Levin =

Israeli footballer (1937–2024)

Personal information
- Date of birth: 3 March 1937
- Place of birth: Petah Tikva, Mandatory Palestine
- Date of death: 21 April 2024 (aged 87)
- Position: Goalkeeper

Senior career*
Years	Team	Apps	(Gls)
1954–1957	Hapoel Petah Tikva	5	(0)
1955–1956	→ Hapoel Kfar Saba (loan)		
1957	Hapoel Hadera		
1957–1960	Maccabi Haifa	53	(0)
1960–1969	Maccabi Tel Aviv		
1969–1971	Beitar Jerusalem		
1971–1972	Maccabi Netanya		
1973–1976	Hapoel Jerusalem		

International career
1963–1969	Israel	22	(0)
Medal record
Men's football
Representing Israel
AFC Asian Cup
Gold medal – first place	1964 Israel	Team
Bronze medal – third place	1968 Iran	Team
- * Club domestic league appearances and goals

Haim Levin (Hebrew: חיים לוין; 3 March 1937 – 21 April 2024) was an Israeli football goalkeeper who played for Maccabi Tel Aviv and the Israel national team in the 1960s.

== Career ==
Levin played for Maccabi Haifa in the late 1950s, playing 56 matches. He was elected Israeli Footballer of the Year in 1965. He left Maccabi Tel Aviv in 1969 and went on to play for Beitar Jerusalem, Maccabi Netanya, and Hapoel Jerusalem.

Levin made 22 appearances in the Israel national team and participated in the 1968 Summer Olympics in Mexico.

In the 1980s Levin returned to former club Maccabi Haifa, working as a goalkeeper coach in the senior team and the youth department.

== Death ==
Levin died on 21 April 2024, at the age of 87. He had four daughters.

== Honours ==
Maccabi Tel Aviv

- Israeli championships: 1966–68
- State Cup: 1963–64, 1964–65, 1966–67
- Asian Club Championship: 1968–69
- Israeli Supercup: 1964–65 (shared cup with Hakoah Ramat Gan), 1967–68

Individual

- Israeli Footballer of the Year: 1965
