= Vico Haddad =

Israeli footballer and manager

Personal information
- Full name: Victor Haddad
- Date of birth: 1960 (age 65–66)
- Place of birth: Beersheba, Israel

Youth career
- Hapoel Be'er Sheva

Senior career*
Years	Team	Apps	(Gls)
- Hapoel Be'er Sheva

Managerial career
- Asa Ben-Gurion futsal
- 1993–1994: Hapoel Be'er Sheva
- 1994–1995: Maccabi Netanya
- 1995–1996: Hapoel Haifa
- 1996: Hapoel Rishon LeZion
- 1997: Bnei Yehuda
- 2002–2016: Israel national futsal team
- 2007–2008: Hapoel Be'er Sheva (advisor)
- 2010: Hapoel Be'er Sheva
- * Club domestic league appearances and goals

Victor "Vico" Haddad (Hebrew: ויקטור "ויקו" חדד) is a former Tunisian-Jewish Israeli footballer and football manager. He is the long-time manager of Ben-Gurion University of the Negev's Sports Center and, since 2013, the chairman of Asa, the national organization for academic sports.
