= Amit Ohana =

Israeli association footballer (born 2004)

Personal information
- Full name: Amit Ohana
- Date of birth: 13 November 2006 (age 19)
- Place of birth: Israel
- Height: 1.85 m (6 ft 1 in)
- Position: Forward

Team information
- Current team: Hapoel Be'er Sheva
- Number: 19

Youth career
- 2017–2025: Hapoel Petah Tikva
- 2025–2026: Hapoel Be'er Sheva

Senior career*
Years	Team	Apps	(Gls)
2025–	Hapoel Be'er Sheva	4	(1)
- * Club domestic league appearances and goals as of 22:36, 18 October 2026 (UTC)

Amit Ohana (Hebrew: עמית אוחנה; born 13 November 2006) is an Israeli professional footballer who plays as an forward for Israeli Premier League club Hapoel Be'er Sheva.

== Early life ==
Ohana was born and raised in Israel, to an Israeli family of both Sephardi Jewish and Mizrahi Jewish descent.

Ohana father, Yuval, supported the football careers of both Amit and his younger brother Noam, who is also a footballer. In 2025, while attending one of Noam training sessions at Hapoel Petah Tikva training ground in Kfar Sirkin, Yuval suffered a medical emergency and was hospitalized. He was declared brain death several days later and died at the age of 49.

== Club career ==
=== Hapoel Petah Tikva ===
Ohana joined the youth academy of Hapoel Petah Tikva at the age of 11 and progressed through the club's youth ranks. In the 2023–24 season, Ohana played for Hapoel Petah Tikva under-19 team, scoring 17 league goals as the club earned promotion to the Israeli U19 Premier League.

Ohana made his senior debut for Hapoel Petah Tikva on 8 August 2024, in a Toto Cup match against Maccabi Jaffa. He came on as a substitute in the 86th minute as Hapoel Petah Tikva won 2–1.

=== Hapoel Be'er Sheva ===
In January 2025, Ohana joined the youth academy of Hapoel Be'er Sheva. During his first year at the club, he became a regular goalscorer for the under-19 side. Over his first 30 appearances for Hapoel Be'er Sheva under-19, he scored 18 goals in all competitions. During the 2025–26 season, Ohana was promoted to the first-team squad. On 29 January 2026, Ohana signed his first professional contract with Hapoel Be'er Sheva, agreeing to a four-and-a-half-year deal that would keep him at the club until the summer of 2030. He made his senior debut for Hapoel Be'er Sheva on 23 May 2026, coming on as a substitute in a league match against Maccabi Haifa.

Ahead of the 2026–27 season, Ohana became part of Hapoel Be'er Sheva first-team squad. He featured in the 2026 Israel Super Cup against Maccabi Tel Aviv on 16 July 2026, before making his European debut on 21 July, coming on as a late substitute against Víkingur Reykjavík in Champions League qualifying. On 29 August 2026, Ohana made his first Israeli Premier League start for Hapoel Be'er Sheva, away to Hapoel Ramat Gan at Rehovot Stadium. In the 61st minute, he scored his first senior goal, giving Hapoel Be'er Sheva the lead in an eventual 2–1 victory.

== Career statistics ==
=== Club ===
As of 18 October 2026

Appearances and goals by club, season and competition
Club	Season	League			State Cup		League cup (Note: Appearance(s) in Israel Super Cup) (Note: Appearance(s) in Toto Cup (Liga Leumit))		Continental (Europe)		Other		Total	
Club	Season	Division	Apps	Goals	Apps	Goals	Apps	Goals	Apps	Goals	Apps	Goals	Apps	Goals
Hapoel Petah Tikva	2023–24	Liga Leumit	0	0	0	0	1	0	–	–	0	0	0	0
Hapoel Petah Tikva	Total		0	0	0	0	1	0	0	0	0	0	1	0
Hapoel Be'er Sheva	2025–26	Israeli Premier League	1	0	0	0	0	0	0	0	0	0	1	0
Hapoel Be'er Sheva	2026–27	Israeli Premier League	3	1	0	0	1	0	3	0	0	0	7	1
Hapoel Be'er Sheva	Total		4	1	0	0	1	0	3	0	0	0	8	1
Career total			4	1	0	0	2	0	3	0	0	0	9	1

== Honours ==
Hapoel Beer Sheva

- Israeli Premier League: 2025–26

== See also ==
- List of Jewish footballers
- List of Jews in sports
- List of Israelis
- List of Israel international footballers
