= Hisham Zuabi =

Israeli footballer and manager

Hisham Zuabi هشام الزعبي
Personal information
- Full name: Hisham Zuabi
- Date of birth: 16 May 1969 (age 57)
- Place of birth: Tamra, Jezreel Valley, Israel
- Position: Striker

Team information
- Current team: Maccabi Umm al-Fahm

Senior career*
| Years | Team | Apps | (Gls) |
- Hapoel Daliyat al-Karmel
| 1991–1992 | Maccabi Tel Aviv | 15 | (1) |
- Hapoel Haifa
- Hapoel Be'er Sheva
- Maccabi Kafr Kanna
| 1997–1998 | Hapoel Tzafririm Holon | | |
| 1998–1999 | Maccabi Netanya | | |
| 1999–2003 | Maccabi Kafr Kanna | | |

Managerial career
- 2004–2006: Hapoel Bnei Lod
- 2006: Maccabi Ahi Nazareth
- 2006–2010: Maccabi Kafr Kanna
- 2010–2011: Bnei Tayibe
- 2011: F.C. Bu'eine
- 2013–2014: Hapoel Ironi Baqa al-Gharbiyye
- 2014–2015: Maccabi Sulam
- 2015–2016: F.C. Daburiyya
- 2016–2017: Hapoel Umm al-Fahm
- 2017–2019: Tzeirei Kafr Kanna
- 2019–2020: Hapoel Bu'eine
- 2020–2021: Maccabi Umm al-Fahm
- 2021: Tzeirei Kfar Kana
- 2024: Maccabi Umm al-Fahm
- * Club domestic league appearances and goals

Hisham Zuabi (Arabic: هشام الزعبي, Hebrew: הישאם זועבי; born 16 May 1969) is an Israeli former professional footballer and currently acts as the manager of Maccabi Umm al-Fahm.
