= Shlomo Iluz =

Israeli footballer

Shlomo Iluz שלמה אילוז
Personal information
- Full name: Shlomo Iluz
- Date of birth: 13 April 1959 (age 67)
- Place of birth: Be'er Sheva, Israel
- Height: 1.83 m (6 ft 0 in)
- Position: Center back

Youth career
- Hapoel Be'er Sheva

Senior career*
Years	Team	Apps	(Gls)
1977–1996	Hapoel Be'er Sheva	515	

International career^{‡}
1988–1990	Israel	6	(0)
- * Club domestic league appearances and goals as of 27 July 2015 ‡ National team caps and goals as of 27 July 2015

Shlomo Iluz (Hebrew: שלמה אילוז; born 13 April 1959) is a former Israeli professional footballer that has played as a center back for Hapoel Be'er Sheva.

== Honours ==
=== Club ===
Hapoel Be'er Sheva

  - Third place (4): 1982/1983, 1987/1988, 1993/1994, 1994/1995
- State Cup:
  - Runners-up (1): 1983/1984
- Toto Cup:
  - Winners (2): 1988/1989, 1995/1996
  - Runners-up (1): 1985/1986
- Lillian Cup:
  - Winners (1): 1988
  - Runners-up (2): 1982, 1983
