= Vasermil Stadium =

Football stadium in Be'er Sheva, Israel

Coordinates: 31°15′13.66″N 34°47′09.47″E

Vasermil Stadium אצטדיון וסרמיל
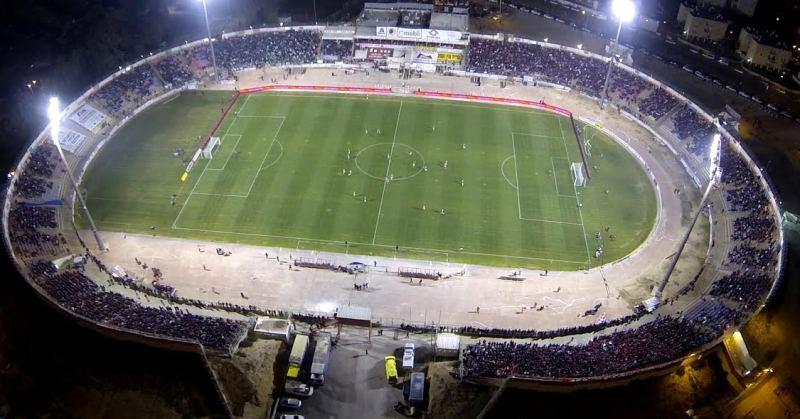
- Interactive map of Vasermil Stadium אצטדיון וסרמיל
- Full name: Arthur Vasermil Municipal Stadium האצטדיון העירוני ע"ש ארתור וסרמיל
- Location: Be’er Sheva, Israel
- Capacity: 13,000
- Surface: Grass

Construction
- Opened: 1959
- Renovated: 1988, 2001
- Closed: 2015
- Demolished: 2019

Tenants
- Hapoel Be'er Sheva (1960–2015); Maccabi Be'er Sheva (2005–2006)

The Arthur Vasermil Municipal Stadium was a football stadium in Be’er Sheva, Israel. The stadium was designed as an open bowl (though a small part of one side was covered). At one stage it had a running track that was later bricked over. In its final form the stadium was all-seated with a capacity of 13,000.

== History ==
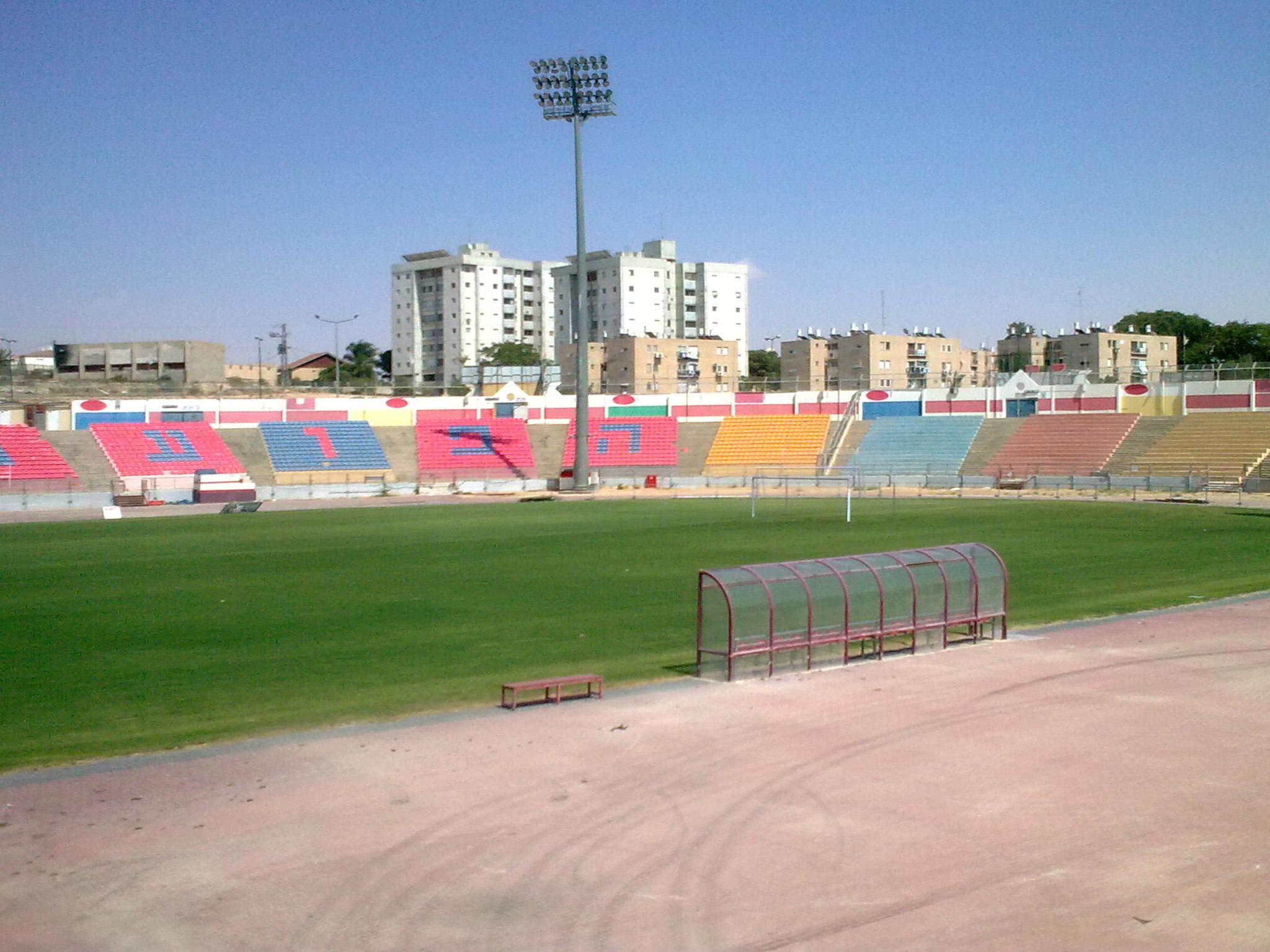

The stadium was the home ground of Hapoel Be'er Sheva from its opening in 1959. Initially known as the Municipal Stadium, it was renamed in 1988 when the mother of Arthur Vasermil financed stadium refurbishment work; Vasermil was murdered at Majdanek concentration camp during the Holocaust at the age of seven.

During the 2005–06 season, it also served as the home ground for Maccabi Be'er Sheva for their Liga Leumit season, as their ground did not meet the required standard for Liga Leumit. Maccabi returned to their grounds with their relegation back to Liga Artzit.

The ground was used for international football when Israel played the United States in friendly match on 15 November 1973, with Israel winning 2–0 in front of 3,000 spectators. In 1979 the Netherlands national team drew 1–1 against the Israel national football team in Vasermil.

Despite a survey of Beersheba residents finding that the overwhelming majority would prefer the city to renovate the old stadium rather than building a new one, the city council demolished the stadium after the completion of the US$50 million 16,000-seat Turner Stadium, which opened in 2015.

== See also ==
Sports in Israel
