= Hapoel Be'er Sheva F.C. =

Hapoel Be'er Sheva
- Full name: Hapoel Be'er Sheva Football Club
- Nicknames: The Camels; The Reds from the South
- Short name: HBS
- Founded: 1 May 1949; 77 years ago
- Ground: Turner Stadium, Be'er Sheva
- Capacity: 16,126
- Owner: Alona Barkat
- Chairman: Nir Katz
- Head coach: Ran Kozuch
- League: Israeli Premier League
- 2025–26: Israeli Premier League, 1st of 14 (champions)
- Website: hbsfc.co.il
Home colours	Away colours	Third colours

Hapoel Be'er Sheva Football Club (Hebrew: מועדון הכדורגל הפועל באר שבע, Moadon HaKaduregel Hapoel Be'er Sheva) is an Israeli professional football club from the city of Be'er Sheva, that competes in the Israeli Premier League. The club was established in 1949, and since 2007 it has been run by businesswoman Alona Barkat, who serves as the club's owner. The club also fields youth teams, and a women's side. There is also a football academy.

The home uniform colors of the club are red and white. Until 1959, the club played its home games at a stadium that was located in the old city of Be'er Sheva. In 1960, the club moved to Vasermil Stadium. Starting from the 2015–16 season, the home ground of the team is Turner Stadium.

The club began to win titles in the 1970s. Throughout the years, the team has won six championships, four State Cup, four Toto Cup (One in Liga Leumit), six Super Cup (One in the Second Division) and one Lilian Cup. Be'er Sheva is also the first team in the history of Israeli football to play in a European competition, together with Beitar Jerusalem, and the first team in the history of Israeli football that played in the UEFA Cup together with Hapoel Tel Aviv.

== History ==
A chart showing the progress of Hapoel Be'er Sheva through the Israeli football league system, from 1954–55 to the present

=== Early years ===
The team started in 1949, when Zalman Caspi was a footballer at Hapoel Ramat Gan. He set up a department to find young talents in the transit camps in the Be'er Sheva area, in order to eventually establish a soccer team. In April 1950, the group was established in the framework of the Hapoel Center.

Hapoel Be'er Sheva played for the first time on 1 May 1950 and won 5–4 Hapoel Mefalsim, a team made up of players who immigrated to Israel from South America. The goals were scored by Marcus Abergil (duo), Henry Lev (duo) and Baruch Cohen. At that time, the team participated in friendly matches against teams from the two senior leagues, and Derby was held against Maccabi Be'er Sheva, which ended with a 3–3 draw.

In 1952, the club official activity was suspended after the Association decided that the geographical distance would not allow its participation, but in 1954 the group was re-registered in the 1954–55 league in the Negev region of Liga Gimel, the third league at the time. Be'er Sheva finished the season in the seventh and final place in the Negev region with one win from 12 games, 22 mandatory goals and only 5 goals.

The 1955–56 season, under the guidance of coach Yosef Azran, finished first in the Southern District of Liga Gimel, the fourth league at the time. In the qualifying games for relegation to Liga Bet, Be'er Sheva competed against Hapoel Lod, Hapoel Ramla and Hapoel Holon, and in the decisive game in Rehovot she beat Hapoel Jaffa 0–5 and qualified for the second division. In the 1956–57 season, the team finished seventh in the league in the Southern District.

In the 1957–58 season, Lonia Dvorin replaced Yosef Azran at the coaching post. In the same season, the Football Association stopped all the leagues under the first division towards their end, with Be'er Sheva in second place leading to the first round of tests, following suspicions of bribes and biases, all of which have been frozen for the season. At the end of the season the team reached the final of the "Football Association Cup", but lost 7–1 to Hapoel Tiberias.

In the 1958–59 season the team finished second in the league in the Southern District and qualified for the first stage of the tests. In the first test game she lost 0–5 to Hapoel Afula and Dvorin resigned from the team coaching. Former Israeli national team coach Jack Gibbons took his place and led the team to Liga Alef after winning the decisive game against Hapoel Netanya in Rehovot 2–1.

=== 1960s ===
In the 1959–60 season, Hapoel Be'er Sheva moved to play on a lawn in the municipal stadium in Be'er Sheva. This season, Yechiel Mor, 27-year-old from Hapoel Ramat Gan, joined the team and began to serve as player-coach. Under his guidance, the team finished ninth in Liga Alef. In preparation for the 1960–61 Beer Sheva played their first game against an international team when she hosted Cyprus Anorthosis Famagusta for a friendly game, which ended in a 1–2 loss. This season they finished ninth again.

In the 1961–62 season, Rober Eryol was appointed coach of the team, but after five matches Be'er Sheva remained without points, and the club decided to fire Eryol and rehire coach Yechiel Mor back. In the same season, the team reached the semi-finals of the State Cup for the first time in history, in the Liga Alef, after beating Hapoel Ramla 2–1 in the eighth round. In the quarterfinals, Hapoel Tel Aviv won 3–1 and was eliminated after a loss 3–0 to Maccabi Tel Aviv in the semi-finals.

In the 1963–64 season, the league was divided into two districts – North and South, and Be'er Sheva finished as the "winter champion" in the Liga Alef South. Be'er Sheva struggled with Beitar Tel Aviv to advance to the national league in the Southern District, and at the end of the season Beitar Tel Aviv finished first with a better goal differential.

In the 1964–65 season, under the guidance of Yugoslav coach Slavko Milošević, the team competed for the national league against Beitar Ramla and Beitar Jerusalem, and finally finished first in the Liga Alef South league, with a gap of nine points from second place, and qualified for the national league for the first time in its history. In addition, the team reached the quarterfinals of the State Cup after defeating Hapoel Haifa from the Liga Leumit. In the quarterfinals they lost 2–4 to Hapoel Tel Aviv after an extension. During the season of promotion, Eliyahu Offer, midfielder-striker Abraham Noma and purchasing player Haim Cohen, who was the team top scorer with 20 goals this season, were conspicuous in the season.

In the 1965–66 season, Yugoslav Selvole Stanković was named coach of the team and was joined by midfielder Yitzhak Gozlan, who came from Hapoel Ofakim. This season, Be'er Sheva promised to stay only in the last round, when she beat Maccabi Netanya 4–0 and finished 13th in the league.

In the summer of 1966, Yehiel Mor was again appointed coach of the team, and the offensive midfielder Meir Barad was joined from the Youth department to the first team. After 12 rounds the team led the league table and later joined the team of youth player Rafi Eliyahu. At the end of the double season 1966–68, the team finished ninth in the table, and Abraham Noma won the Israeli Footballer of the Year award.

In the 1968–69 season, Selvole Stepanović was appointed coach of the team, but already at the beginning of the season to they fell into last place in the league. As a result, the management summoned the former coach of the team, Lonia Dvorin, to serve as a professional manager. After the 16th round, Stepanović was fired and replaced by Moshe Litbek. Under his guidance, the team managed to finish in 14th place and remain in the league. In addition, the team reached the quarterfinals of the State Cup after a 2–1 victory over Bnei Yehuda Tel Aviv in the eighth round. In the quarterfinals the team lost 2–3 to Maccabi Sha'arayim.

=== The early 1970s ===
In the 1969–70 season, under the guidance of Avraham Menchel, the team scored only a few goals, finishing with only 24 goals, and was soaking it up when it finished with 49 goals against. Among other things, the team lost 0–8 to Hapoel Tel Aviv. The team finished the season in the 16th and final place in the table, and went down to Liga Alef after five years in the Liga Leumit.

In the 1970–71 season, Moshe Litbek returned to the position of coach of the team. Which began on the basis of its young players at the end of the season, the team returned to the top league from first place in the Liga Alef South, with a gap of 14 points from the second Hapoel Yehud, when Meir Barad finished the season as the team's top scorer with 18 goals. The decision was made by the champions of Liga Alef North, Maccabi Jaffa, in the Super Cup to the second league.

At the beginning of the 1971–72 season, Be'er Sheva was in the top ranks of the Liga Leumit, but Meir Barad injury and a dispute between the club's management and Rafi Eliyahu led the team to the bottom of the league. The return of Barad and Eliyahu two months later did not change their luck, and the team finished 12th in the table with just 25 goals, with Barad finishing the season as king of the team with 11 goals. In the same season, the team met with Aston Villa, one of the top three teams in England at the time, and won it 3–1.

In the 1972–73 season, Eli Fuchs was appointed coach of the team, and was joined by the pioneer Shalom Avitan from Beitar Be'er Sheva. The team opened at the bottom, but improved with the progress of the season thanks to Avraham Numa who was the team top scorer with 14 goals this season, finishing fifth in the table, the best position in its history until then.

The 1973–74 season, started poorly, and after 18 matches Be'er Sheva was in 14th place in the league, but as the league progressed, it improved and finished the season in seventh place in the table. In addition, the team reached the quarter-finals of the State Cup, in which it lost 1–3 to Hapoel Petah Tikva in summing up two games.

=== First honours ===
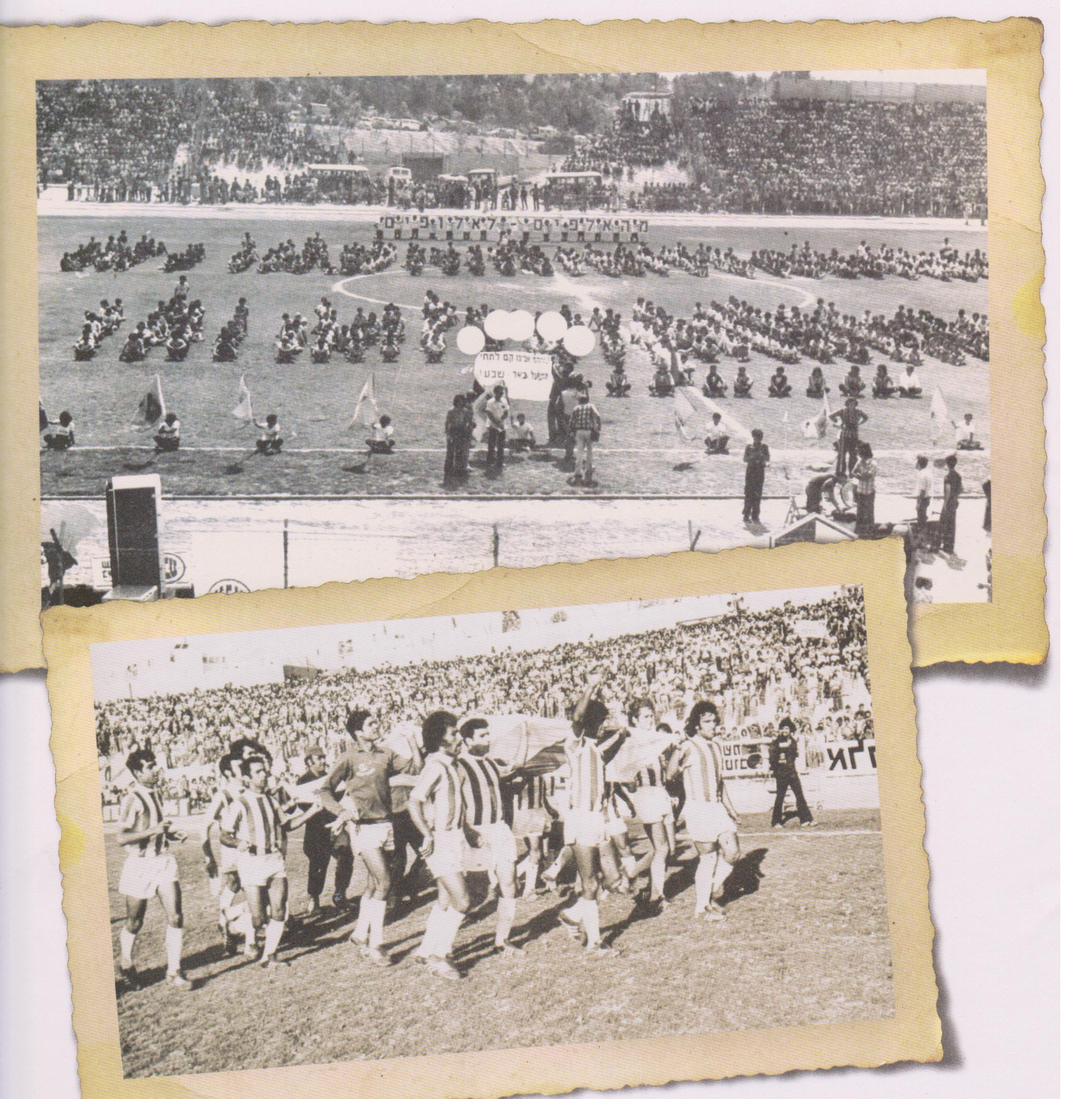
The first championship celebrations at Vasermil Stadium

In the 1974–75 season, Amazia Levkovich was appointed coach of the team when he was 37, and was considered a young coach in relation to the leading and leading coaches in Israel. Levkovich was the first coach to introduce the style of the attacking defenders in Israel, a style taken from German football. Levkovich combined young players, among them 20-year-old Uri Benjamin as a right-wing defender and 18-year-old Jacob Cohen as a left-wing defender. The team was one of the young players in the league, and included only four players who had reached the age of 25. The team started the season with three wins, including a victory over last season champions Maccabi Netanya, without conceding a single goal. During the season she competed for the championship against Maccabi Netanya, and the decision came one match before the end of the season. Be'er Sheva played against Maccabi Jaffa, with one point separating it from Maccabi Netanya from the second place, and winning 1–0 from the gate of Efraim Zvi Hapoel Be'er Sheva was crowned the country's Liga Leumit champion for the first time in its history, with most of the players being home players. Efraim Zvi finished the season as the team's top scorer with 10 goals, and Uri Benjamin won the title Footballer of the Year in Israel.

In the summer 1975 the team participated in the Super Cup game for the first time in its history, and won the title after a 2–1 victory over Hapoel Kfar Saba.

In the 1975–76 season, Be'er Sheva opened the league in a disappointing way when it finished twice in the first two rounds, but in the following rounds improved, and in the fifth round it was ranked first in this season in the first place in the table. During the season she fought for the first place against Beitar Jerusalem, and in the closing round Be'er Sheva again met Maccabi Jaffa for a decisive game. This time Jaffa fought against the decline and had to win to stay in the Liga Leumit, while Be'er Sheva wanted to win to secure the championship Beitar Jerusalem met Maccabi Tel Aviv, which also fought against the decline, and had to win. Maccabi Jaffa won 1–0, but after the defeat of Beitar Jerusalem, Be'er Sheva won a second consecutive championship. Shalom Avitan, who returned to the team at the beginning of the season, finished him as the team's top scorer with 11 goals.

In the summer of 1976 Be'er Sheva and Beitar Jerusalem were the first teams in the history of Israeli football to play in a UEFA Intertoto Cup. Be'er Sheva was drawn to Group 2 and held six games in a "home-away" Against the teams Køge BK from Denmark, Herta Berlin from Germany and Standard Liège from Belgium The balance of the team in the factory was one victory, 2–1 on Køge BK at Vasermil Stadium, three draw results and lost 2 consecutive wins for the second time in a row, losing to the Beitar Jerusalem Super Cup holder 2–3 after extra time.

=== The late 1970s ===
In the 1976–77 season, Be'er Sheva almost became the first champion team to go down in the league. Under the guidance of Eli Fuchs, who returned to coaching the team, Be'er Sheva opened the season badly and fell to the bottom. As a result, after 16 rounds Fuchs resigned from the coaching team, and Eliyahu Offer, who retired from regular activity as a player during the season and also served as Fuchs's assistant, was named coach. Two rounds to the end of the season the team met away from home with Maccabi Haifa for a survival game, with only a goal difference separating the two teams in the table. Be'er Sheva won 1–0 and managed to stay in the league while Maccabi Haifa dropped to the second division. In addition, the team reached the quarterfinals of the Israeli Cup again after beating Maccabi Haifa 2–0 in the round of 16 and was eliminated after losing 0–3 to Beitar Tel Aviv.

In the 1977–78 season, the team displayed a good offensive ability throughout the season, led by its top scorer Shalom Avitan, with 12 goals and his runner up Victor Seroussi, with 10 goals, but at the same time showed less defensive ability. Be'er Sheva finished the season in fifth place in the table with 43 goals, the highest in a single season in the history of the team in the first division until then (except for the double season of 1966–68, which scored 71 goals).

In the 1978–79 season, the team finished ninth. In addition, she reached the quarter-finals of the State Cup for the sixth time in her history, following a 2–1 win over Hapoel Kfar Saba in the round of 16. In the quarterfinals she lost to Beitar Tel Aviv in a penalty shootout.

=== The 1980s ===
Towards the 1979–80 season, Amatzia Levkovich returned to coaching the team, and was joined by the young Efraim Davidi of Maccabi Be'er Sheva. The team did not open the season well, and then gave Levkovich a chance to play with other young players. The number of goals conceded, 27, was the lowest since the season of the first championship under Levkovich (1974–75), but the offense was deficient and the team rarely scored goals. The team finished in the tenth place in the table with only seven wins.

Towards the 1980–81 season, Eliyahu Offer returned to the coach position and opened the season well. However, just as the team scored more goals, it was also a great hit, and finished the season in 11th place.

In preparation for the 1981–82 season, the team appointed Shimon Shenhar, and the team opened the season with four losses, two draws and a win, leading to 15th and last place in the league. From the eighth round onwards, the team achieved a series of 11 games without a loss. At the end of the 18th round, the team ranked in fourth place in the table, which they managed to keep until the end of the season. Be'er Sheva showed a good attacking ability during the season, scoring 43 goals and equaling the record for one season. The team's top scorer was Shalom Avitan with 14 goals. In addition, the team reached the semi-finals in the State Cup, after beating Maccabi Netanya in the round of 16, 1–0, and in the quarterfinals they won 4–0 in Ramat Gan. In the semi-finals they met Hapoel Tel Aviv and lost 3–5 in the penalty shootout after 2–2 at the end of extra time.

The fourth place in the league gave Be'er Sheva a ticket to the Lilian Cup, a tournament that was played in the 1980s. In preparation for the 1982–83 season, the team played in the tournament and won 3–1 against Maccabi Netanya. In this season, Be'er Sheva played a very good defensive ability and conceded only 23 goals, the lowest number of goals conceded since the first season. Be'er Sheva finished third in the table, and the reigning top scorer was again Shalom Avitan with 11 goals.

In preparation for the 1983–84 season, Eliyahu Offer returned to the position of coach. The team played again against Maccabi Netanya in the Lilian Cup final and lost 2–3. In the league, the team failed to maintain stability, rocking throughout the season between mid-table and bottom, and finally finished seventh in the table. In addition, they reached the finals of the Israeli Cup for the first time in their history, after winning 4–2 in the quarterfinals against Hapoel Tel Aviv in a penalty shootout after a replay, and in the semi-finals they defeated Maccabi Netanya. In the final, the team lost 2–3 in a penalty shootout to Hapoel Lod after 0–0 at the end of the extra time.

In preparation for the 1984–85 season, Zvi Rosen was appointed coach of the team, who scored few goals and finished the season with the lowest number of goals since the 1976–77 season, and faced the danger of a relegation. Three rounds to the end of the season, being 5 points from where they remain in the league, Rosen was fired and replaced by former teammate Jackie Dekel, who managed to keep the team in the top league.

In preparation for the 1985–86 season, Nahum Stelmach was appointed coach, and his assistant was appointed former player of the team Alon Ben Dor. This season, the team reached the Toto Cup final for the first time in their history, after beating Maccabi Tel Aviv 2–1 in the semi-finals. In the final they lost to Hapoel Petah Tikva 1–2. In the league, the team barely scored and finished the season with 24 goals, but also scored a low 24 points, the lowest since the 1969–70 season. Throughout the season the team wandered between the bottom and middle of the table, finally finishing eighth in the table.

In preparation for the 1986–87 season, Nino Bargig was appointed coach of the team, which started the season with two losses and a draw. Bargig was fired and replaced by Dror Bar-Nur. Under him, the team improved the defense game and finished with only 19 goals, but continued to harden the game and scored only 20 goals. The team's number of goals was the lowest in its history in the first division. Throughout the season, they struggled in the bottom, finishing 11th in the table.

In preparation for the 1987–88 season, the team appointed Nissim Bakhar as coach. During this season the team maintained a high defense capability and improved its offensive ability. The team finished third in the table and won the Lilian Cup for the third time since the tournament was established.

For the 1988–89 season, the team won 1–0 against Hapoel Tel Aviv in the Lilian Cup final. Later in the season, the team reached the final of the Toto Cup and won the Cup for the first time in its history after a victory over Maccabi Netanya. In the league, the team did not impress, and in the 22nd round they let go of coach Nissim Bakhar, when Shimon Shenhar came in for a second term as team coach. Be'er Sheva scored only 22 goals, 29 assists and finished fifth in the table.

=== The 1990s ===
In the 1989–90 season was the first season in which foreign players were allowed to participate in the Israeli league, and Be'er Sheva joined the Argentinian attackers Claudio Dykstra and Ricardo Cacchione. During the season, the team replaced four coaches, Shimon Shenhar, who finished in the fifth round, past players Haim Cohen and Alon Ben Dor, and Eliyahu Offer, who was appointed towards the end of the season in which the team finished ninth in the league.

In the 1990–91 season, the team qualified for the playoffs, finishing sixth in the table. In the 1991–92 season, the team conceded 43 goals, the highest number of conceded goals since the 1969–70 season. On the other hand, the team also scored a great deal of goals, ending the season with 40 goals, the highest number of goals since 1981–82, and finished the season in tenth place in the table.

In the 1992–93 season, Uri Malmilian and Hisham Zuabi joined the team. After five rounds Eliyahu Offer was fired and replaced by assistant coach Vico Haddad. Be'er Sheva showed a good offensive ability during the season, when Zuabi finished as runner up of the league's top scorer with 17 goals, and sets a record for scoring with Be'er Sheva in the senior league. The entire team finished the season with 52 goals, the highest number of goals ever scored in one season in the top league, as well as their best ever goal differential in the top division, and fourth in the table.

In the 1993–94 season, the team again broke the record for the season in the Premier League and scored 54 goals, and had their best goal difference in the league. Amir Avigdor finished the season as the team's top scorer with 16 goals, the team finished third and won a UEFA Cup spot for the first time in which Israeli teams participated.

In the 1994–95 season Vitaly Savchenko of Ukraine was appointed to coach the team. In the UEFA Cup, the team was defeated against Aris Thessaloniki from Greece, losing twice to the team and being eliminated from the competition.

In the 1995–96 Liga Leumit season, Vico Haddad was again appointed as coach. In the first qualifying phase of the UEFA Cup, the team beat SK Tirana of Albania, and was then knocked out of the competition after a double encounter against FC Barcelona in which they lost 0–7 at home and 5–0 away. Later in the season Haddad was fired and replaced by former coach Vitaly Savchenko, The team won the second time in their history in the Toto Cup, after beating Hapoel Kfar Saba in the final game, and the team showed poor ability to score, and Savchenko was replaced by Eli Guttman, who finished with 32 points and 10th in the table.

In the 1996–97 season, Guttman led the team to their first win in the State Cup, following a 1–0 victory over Maccabi Tel Aviv in the final game, with the goal coming from Giovanni Rosso. In the league, the team finished the season in third place, after missing the second place in the last round of the season, with 25 goals conceded and the best goal differential in their history in the top league.

In the summer of 1997, then-owner Eli Lahav decided to release many of the leading players in the team, including Giovanni Rosso, Sejad Halilović and Shai Holtzman, and then left the team and transferred ownership to Eli Zino. As a result, the team opened the 1997–98 season with a small staff. Due to the lack of players, the team brought youth player Yossi Benayoun to the senior team at the age of 17, and coach appointed Benny Tabak. In the first qualifying phase of the UEFA Cup Winners' Cup, the team faced FK Žalgiris from Lithuania, and was then knocked out of the competition by Roda JC from Netherlands, who lost 4–1 at home and 10–0 away. After the defeat Tabak resigned, replacing Jackie Dekel again. Yossi Benayoun scored 15 goals this season, including a dramatic goal in a 1–0 win over Maccabi Haifa in the final round, but due to their opponent's victory in Bnei Yehuda Tel Aviv, the team dropped to the second division after 27 consecutive years in the Liga Leumit. With the highest number of goals conceded in its history in one season in the Liga Leumit.

In preparation for the 1998–99 season, in the Liga Artzit, Shiye Feigenbaum was appointed coach of the team, and during the season was replaced by Gili Landau. The team struggled with Maccabi Netanya to join the Premier League, but finally finished in third place in the table.

=== The beginning of the millennium ===
In preparation for the 1999–2000 season, Eliyahu Offer returned to coaching the team, and was later replaced by Motti Ivanir. Towards the end of the season Ivanir was replaced by Eyal Lahman, and the team failed again in their attempt to qualify for the first division after finishing seventh in the table, while Beitar Be'er Sheva was fifth and above them in the table.

In the 2000–01 season, Eyal Lahman continued on the sidelines, but was fired during the season and was replaced by Shlomo Scharf, who resigned after two rounds, and Lufa Kadosh replaced him as Be'er Sheva returned to the top of the Liga Leumit to fight for the Premier League. this season the team met with Beitar Jerusalem in the Premier League in the State Cup, and won 3–2 after an extra time. Be'er Sheva met Hapoel Ramat Gan for the first division game, Be'er Sheva won 5–0 and secured their promotion to the Premier League from the first place.

In the first two seasons after their return to the Premier League, the team finished twice in fifth place, and in the 2002–03 season it even reached the finals of the State Cup after beating Hapoel Tel Aviv F.C. with a 1–0 win at Bloomfield Stadium and a 3–0 win against Maccabi Haifa. In the final, Be'er Sheva met Hapoel Ramat Gan of the Liga Leumit, but was beaten by a penalty shootout after a 1–1 at the end of extra time.

In the 2003–04 season Eli Guttman returned to the position of coach, and Alon Mizrahi, Dedi Ben Dayan, Ofir Haim and Blessing Kaku were prominent. In this season Be'er Sheva finished fourth, which earned them a ticket for the UEFA Intertoto Cup competition.

In the 2004–05 season, the team suffered from financial problems and at the end of the season the team got relegated to the Liga Leumit after most of the players were released. The economic problems continued to accompany the team in the next two seasons, finishing fourth in the Liga Leumit.

=== The beginning of the era of Alona Barkat ===
In July 2007, businesswoman Alona Barkat purchased the team from Eli Zino. On 29 August 2007, during a training match against Maccabi Be'er Sheva, the team's striker Chaswe Nsofwa collapsed and died of cardiac arrest.

In the first season of the Alona Barkat era, the 2007–08 season, the team finished fourth in the Liga Leumit and failed to qualify for the Premier League. In the 2008–09 season, Guy Levy was appointed coach of the team, and the midfielder Maor Melikson signed in the club. This season the team managed to return to the Premier League after four years in the Liga Leumit. In the same season, the team won the Toto Cup for the Liga Leumit, after beating Maccabi Herzliya 1–0 in the final.

In the 2009–10 season, Guy Azouri was appointed coach of the team, who signed a number of new players in the team, including David Revivo, Siraj Nassar and Brazilian William Soares, who joined in January. The team presented a weak ability and its supporters protested and demanded Azouri resignation. In March 2010, following a violent incident by a fan towards the coach, Azouri decided to resign. The owner, Barkat, announced that following the fans behavior, she will leave the team at the end of the season. The fans launched a campaign to keep her at the club, and eventually Barkat stayed at Be'er Sheva. The professional director of the youth department at the time, Vico Haddad, served as coach until the end of the season, when the team finished ninth.

In the 2010–11 season, Nir Klinger was appointed coach of the team. The team started the season well, but in January 2011 the team star Maor Melikson was sold to Wisła Kraków, and after that there was a significant decline in its ability. In the last round of the regular season they managed to reach the mid-table playoffs, after a 2–0 away win over Maccabi Tel Aviv, and finished the season for the second time in a row in ninth place.

In the 2011–12 season, owner Alona Barkat decided to build on young home players, including the left defender Ofir Davidzada, with experienced players, but the season started badly, when the team lost six consecutive games. In the seventh round the team won 0–2 against Hapoel Haifa, and at the end of the game Klinger decided to resign. Nir Klinger was replaced by Guy Levy, who returned to another term as coach of the team and signed a contract until the end of the season. In the last round, the team won 3–1 against Beitar Jerusalem, and then finished in 13th place and stayed in the Premier League.

In the 2012–13 season, owner Alona Barkat signed outgoing coach of Maccabi Haifa Elisha Levi. This season a senior goalie in the form of Austin Ejide signed. In the same season, the team reached the Toto Cup final against Hapoel Haifa and lost 0–1, when Ido Exbard, missed a Penalty kick in the 88th minute. In this season the team reached the lower playoffs. Following the 3–0 victory against Maccabi Netanya, Be'er Sheva finished eighth, and Maccabi Netanya was relegated to the Liga Leumit.

=== Return to the top ===
In preparation for the 2013–14 season, Alona Barkat decided to sign Elisha Levi for another season, and to bring together players with a name and potential for the future. As a result, Alona Barkat increased the budget Accordingly, big players such as Elyaniv Barda, Maor Buzaglo, Glynor Plet signed. These signings led the team to its best season since the championship season, finishing the season in second place. As a result, the club received a ticket to the UEFA Europa League 2nd qualification round.

In the 2014–15 season, the team returned to the European competitions after 18 years of absence playing against RNK Split in the 2nd qualification round of the UEFA Europa League. Due to the national security situation at that time, the Israeli teams were forced to host their home games in Cyprus. The first game was held in Croatia and ended 1–2 in favor of the Croatians, Be'er Sheva was eliminated from Europe after the second leg finished 0–0 in Cyprus. That season, a number of big players were signed such as Maor Melikson and Shlomi Arbeitman who returned from Europe. In addition, John Ogu from Nigeria and Ovidiu Hoban from Romania were signed. In the semi-finals of the State Cup, Be'er Sheva defeated Hapoel Afula 7-0 and qualified for the State Cup final, losing 2–6 to Maccabi Tel Aviv. In the league, the team finished the season in third place.

In the 2015–16 season, Barak Bakhar was appointed as the team's new manager. In addition, a number of leading players were signed such as Anthony Nwakaeme, Shir Tzedek, Maharan Radi and Ben Sahar. As part of the UEFA Europa League, Be'er Sheva was drawn against FC Thun from Switzerland for a home-away game encounter. In the first game held at Teddy Stadium the game ended with a 1–1 draw. Following a 1–2 defeat in the second leg at Stockhorn Arena Be'er Sheva was eliminated from the Europa League. In the fourth round of the season, the team inaugurated the Turner Stadium which was built in the city, in a match against Maccabi Haifa in front of 16,126 spectators. On 21 May 2016. the team won the third championship in its history after 40 years. During the season the team had 29 games without a loss, and throughout the season Be'er Sheva suffered only three losses. In the deciding game of the last round, Be'er Sheva defeated Bnei Sakhnin 3–1 at Turner Stadium and won the championship title.

In the 2016–17 season, Be'er Sheva won the title of Super Cup after winning 4–2 against the cup holder Maccabi Haifa. That season the team participated in the UEFA Champions League qualification reaching the playoffs after beating Sheriff Tiraspol from Moldova and Olympiacos from Greece. In the playoffs the team was eliminated by Celtic and as a result fell to the UEFA Europa League. In the group stage the club won twice against Inter Milan, managed two draws against Southampton and lost twice to Sparta Prague finishing second in the Group and progressing beyond the group stage of a European competition for the first time in their history. In the round of 32, Be'er Sheva was drawn against Beşiktaş from Turkey, and was eliminated after losing 2–5 in the final two games. On 28 December 2016, the team won the Toto Cup of the Israeli Premier League, the third most important Israeli football competition, after a 4–1 win over Ironi Kiryat Shmona in the final game held in Netanya Stadium. On 29 April 2017, Be'er Sheva won 2–1 against Maccabi Tel Aviv in Netanya Stadium achieving the second consecutive championship and the fourth in their history with three games remaining for the season.

In the 2017–18 season, Be'er Sheva won the title of Super Cup for the second time in a row after winning 4–2 against the cup holder Bnei Yehuda Tel Aviv. This season the team took part in qualifying for the UEFA Champions League and reached the playoff stage after beating Budapest Honvéd from Hungary and Ludogorets Razgrad from Bulgaria. In the playoffs, the team was eliminated against Maribor from Slovenia and as a result fell to the UEFA Europa League stage. At the end of the season the team won the fifth championship in its history, and for the third time in a row.

In the 2018–19 season, Be'er Sheva made several changes to its squad, the most significant of which was the sale of Anthony Nwakaeme to Trabzonspor for €1.1 million. In addition, the club released both of its goalkeepers, Dudu Goresh and Guy Haimov, and signed Ohad Levita and Ariel Harush as their replacements. Be'er Sheva purchased Nigel Hasselbaink from Ironi Kiryat Shmona for €1.7 million and acquired Dia Saba from Maccabi Netanya for €2 million, with Guy Melamed moving in the opposite direction as part of the deal. The club also signed Erik Sabo and Hen Ezra from Beitar Jerusalem, as well as Kevin Tapoko from Hapoel Hadera. In the UEFA Champions League qualifiers, Be'er Sheva were drawn against Flora of Estonia in the first qualifying round, defeating them 4–1 away and 3–1 at home. In the second qualifying round, they faced Dinamo Zagreb of Croatia and were eliminated after a 0–5 away defeat and a 2–2 draw at home. Following the 0–5 loss, Greek goalkeeper Giannis Anestis was released from the club. As a result of their elimination from the UEFA Champions League qualifiers, Be'er Sheva entered the third qualifying round of the UEFA Europa League, where they were drawn against APOEL of Cyprus. The club was eliminated from European competitions after a 2–2 home draw and a 1–3 away defeat. On 28 July 2018, Be'er Sheva lost the Super Cup to Hapoel Haifa on 4–5 penalty shootout, after having won the title for two consecutive seasons. On 15 January 2019, the club was eliminated from the State Cup by Maccabi Netanya following a 4–2 penalty shootout defeat. Be'er Sheva finished the season in third place, thereby ending a run of three consecutive league championships.

In the 2019–20 season, Be’er Sheva added several significant players to its squad, including Josué Pesqueira and Ramzi Safuri, while Elton Acolatse joined the club in February 2020. Be’er Sheva were drawn against Laçi of Albania in the first qualifying round of the UEFA Europa League. On 11 July 2019, the club drew 1–1 with Laçi at Laçi Stadium in Laç. On 18 July, Be’er Sheva secured a 1–0 victory at Turner Stadium, advancing to the second qualifying round to face Kairat Almaty of Kazakhstan. On 25 July, Be’er Sheva defeated Kairat Almaty 2–0 at Turner Stadium. The second leg, played on 1 August at Almaty Central Stadium in Almaty, ended in a 1–1 draw, sending Be’er Sheva through to the third qualifying round, where they met Norrköping of Sweden. On 8 August, Be’er Sheva drew 1–1 with Norrköping at Nya Parken in Norrköping. A 3–1 home victory at Turner Stadium. On 15 August secured their progression to the play-off round against Feyenoord of the Netherlands. On 22 August, Be’er Sheva lost 0–3 to Feyenoord at De Kuip in Rotterdam. The second leg on 29 August at Turner Stadium also ended in a 0–3 defeat, resulting in the team elimination from European competitions. On 6 January, Barak Bakhar ended his role as the head coach of Be’er Sheva following a period of unsatisfactory professional results. Bakhar stepped down after four and a half years in charge of the club. On 8 January, Yossi Abukasis signed as head coach of Be'er Sheva. On 13 July 2020, Be’er Sheva won the State Cup, defeating Maccabi Petah Tikva 2–0 in the final held at Bloomfield Stadium. The club finished the season in fourth place in the Premier League.

In the 2020–21 season, Be’er Sheva began the campaign by facing Maccabi Tel Aviv in the Super Cup, which was held in a two-legged format for the first time. Be’er Sheva lost both matches 0–2. Following the defeat in the Super Cup, the club was eliminated from the advanced stages of the Toto Cup and subsequently faced Maccabi Haifa in the placement match for fifth–sixth place, winning 1–0 at Teddy Stadium. Be’er Sheva competed in the UEFA Europa League qualifiers, which during that season were played as single-leg ties rather than the traditional home-and-away format due to the COVID-19 pandemic. In the first qualifying round, Be’er Sheva were drawn against Dinamo Batumi of Georgia, defeating them 3–0 on 27 August 2020 at the Adjarabet Arena. In the second qualifying round, Be’er Sheva faced Laçi of Albania and secured a 2–1 victory on 17 September at the Elbasan Arena. In the third qualifying round, the club was drawn against Motherwell of Scotland and won 3–0 on 24 September at HaMoshava Stadium. In the play-off round, Be’er Sheva were drawn against Viktoria Plzeň of Czech Republic and won 1–0 on 1 October, thereby qualifying for the UEFA Europa League group stage. In the group stage, Be’er Sheva were drawn alongside Bayer Leverkusen of Germany, Slavia Prague of the Czech Republic, and Nice of France. The club finished third in the group, recording a 3–1 victory over Slavia Prague at HaMoshava Stadium and a 1–0 win against Nice at the same venue. On 21 February 2021, Be’er Sheva were eliminated from the State Cup after a 0–1 defeat to Maccabi Tel Aviv in the Round of 16 at Turner Stadium. The club concluded the league season in fourth place.

In the 2021–22 season, Be'er Sheva won the State Cup for the second time in three years, in the final game played at Teddy Stadium in Jerusalem and ended in a 2–2 draw plus overtime and in the penalty shootout, in which the club won 3–1 with goalkeeper Omri Glazer stopping three of four kicks.

In the 2024–25 season, Be'er Sheva appointed Ran Kozuch as head coach on a two-year contract, replacing Elyaniv Barda, whose contract with the club had expired. Be'er Sheva competed in the 2024–25 UEFA Conference League and were drawn in the second qualifying round against Cherno More of the Bulgarian First League. On 25 July 2024, Be'er Sheva played to a 0–0 draw against Cherno More in a match held at Gradski Stadion in Lovech, Bulgaria, due to the ongoing war in Israel. On 1 August, Be'er Sheva defeated Cherno More 2–1 at Huvepharma Arena in Razgrad, Bulgaria advancing to the third qualifying round. In the third round, the club was drawn against Mladá Boleslav. On 8 August, Be'er Sheva drew 0–0 in the first leg at Lokotrans Aréna in Mladá Boleslav, Czech Republic. On 15 August at Gradski Stadion in Lovech, Bulgaria. Be'er Sheva led 2–0 at halftime but ultimately lost 2–4 and were eliminated from European competitions.

On 1 September, Be'er Sheva were scheduled to face Bnei Sakhnin in the third round of the Israeli Premier League. Prior to kickoff, during the playing of the Israeli national anthem, a disturbance broke out among supporters in the stands. According to reports, tensions escalated after allegations that Bnei Sakhnin supporters had shown disrespect during the anthem, prompting Be'er Sheva supporters to enter the pitch. Clashes subsequently erupted between supporters of both teams, though security forces quickly intervened and separated the sides. Following the incident, the police commander at the stadium authorized the match to proceed, and the referee instructed both teams to prepare to resume play. After approximately one hour of delay, Bnei Sakhnin declined to take the field, and the match did not commence. The case was brought before the Israel Football Association's disciplinary court, which ruled that Hapoel Be'er Sheva would be deducted one point and that the match would be recorded as a draw with no points awarded. The matter was later appealed to the Tel Aviv District Court, which rejected Be'er Sheva's petition to overturn the technical ruling against Bnei Sakhnin. However, Judge Gilad Hess recommended that the Israel Football Association consider the possibility of a replay. A subsequent hearing determined that no replay would be held, and the original disciplinary decision remained in effect.

At the conclusion of the season, Be'er Sheva finished in second place, despite ending the regular season at the top of the table. The club lost the league title to Maccabi Tel Aviv by a margin of two points. On 29 May 2025, Be'er Sheva won the State Cup after defeating Beitar Jerusalem in the final.

In the 2025–26 season, on 13 July 2025 Be'er Sheva defeated Maccabi Tel Aviv 2–1 in the Super Cup at Bloomfield Stadium. The club participated in the 2025–26 UEFA Europa League qualifying rounds, Be'er Sheva were eliminated after losing on Penalty shoot-out to Levski Sofia from Bulgaria, following a 0–0 draw away and a 1–1 draw at home. As a result, the team dropped to the second qualifying round of the UEFA Conference League, where they were drawn against AEK Athens from Greece. Be'er Sheva 0–1 lost away and 0–0 draw at home, thereby being eliminated from European competitions for the season. Due to the Gaza war, Israeli clubs were required to host their home matches outside Israel. Be'er Sheva hosted Levski Sofia at Városi Stadion in Nyíregyháza, Hungary, and AEK Athens at Nagyerdei Stadion in Debrecen, Hungary. On 16 August, the club was eliminated in the semi-finals of the Toto Cup after a 0–2 defeat to Hapoel Tel Aviv at Turner Stadium. Be'er Sheva set a club record by scoring 16 league goals in their first three matches of the season. The previous record of 15 goals had been set by Maccabi Tel Aviv in 1952. On 29 September, Be'er Sheva continued their record-breaking start to the season with a 1–0 victory over Maccabi Haifa at Sammy Ofer Stadium, secured by a goal from Dan Biton. The result marked the first time in the club's history that Be'er Sheva opened a top-flight league season with five consecutive wins.

== Stadium and facilities ==
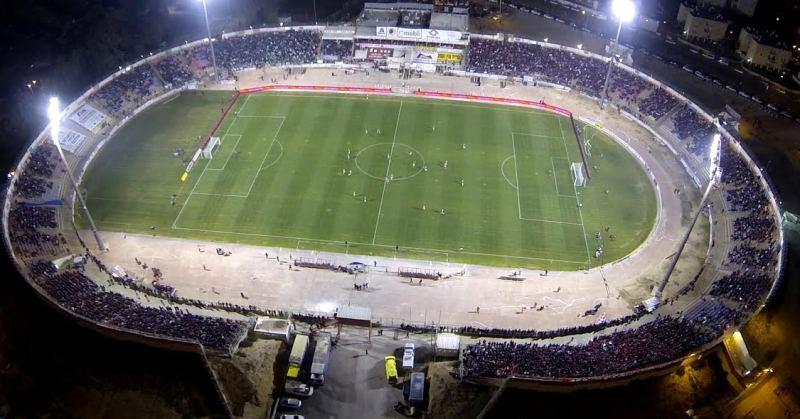
Stadium Vasermil in the 2013–14 season taken from the air during a game against Maccabi Haifa, which ended with the victory of 1–3 to Be'er Sheva

Since its inception in 1949, the club Hapoel Be'er Sheva has played in 3 different plots, starting out playing on the soil surface at the stadium which was located in the old city.

In 1959, the municipal stadium was built and inaugurated in Be'er Sheva on 31 October 1959 in a Hapoel Be'er Sheva game against Hapoel Tel Aviv. December 1988 ended in a major overhaul of the stadium, the contribution of Mrs. Lilly Friedman-Vasermil, and the stadium was named for Arthur Vasermil. Ms. Friedman-Vasermil perpetuated the name of her son, who was murdered in the Holocaust by the Nazis, in 1943, Majdanek extermination camp, at the age of seven.

In 1995, in honor of her portrayal of Hapoel Be'er Sheva in front of a Barcelona UEFA Cup group, the stadium was renovated and plastic seats were installed at the bleachers instead of exposed concrete.

In 2009 the rest of the seats were installed in the galleries, following the return of Hapoel Be'er Sheva Premier League.

On 30 May 2015 the last game was played in Vasermil Stadium, which increased Hapoel Be'er Sheva 4–0 on the team Beitar Jerusalem.

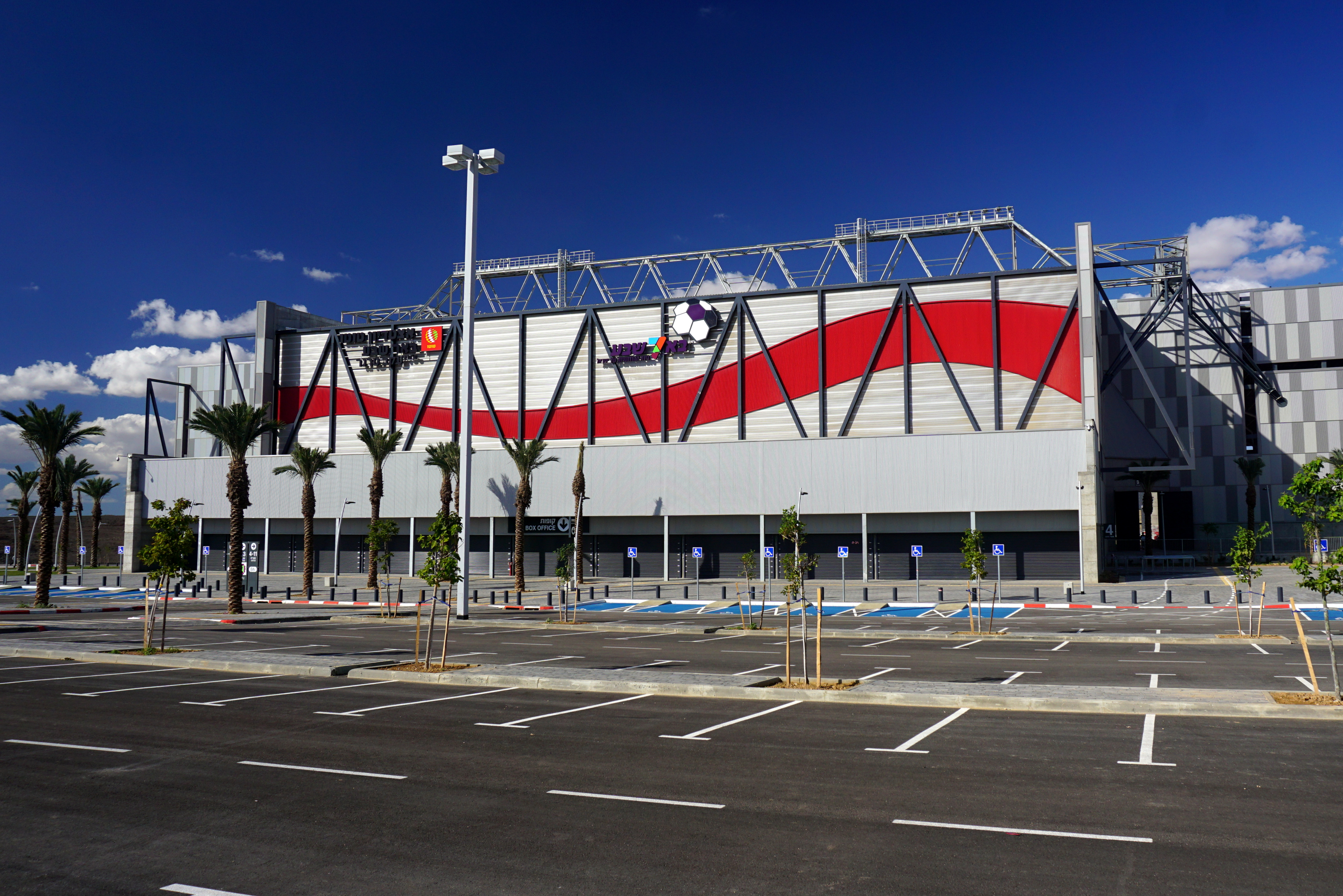
Turner Stadium exterior

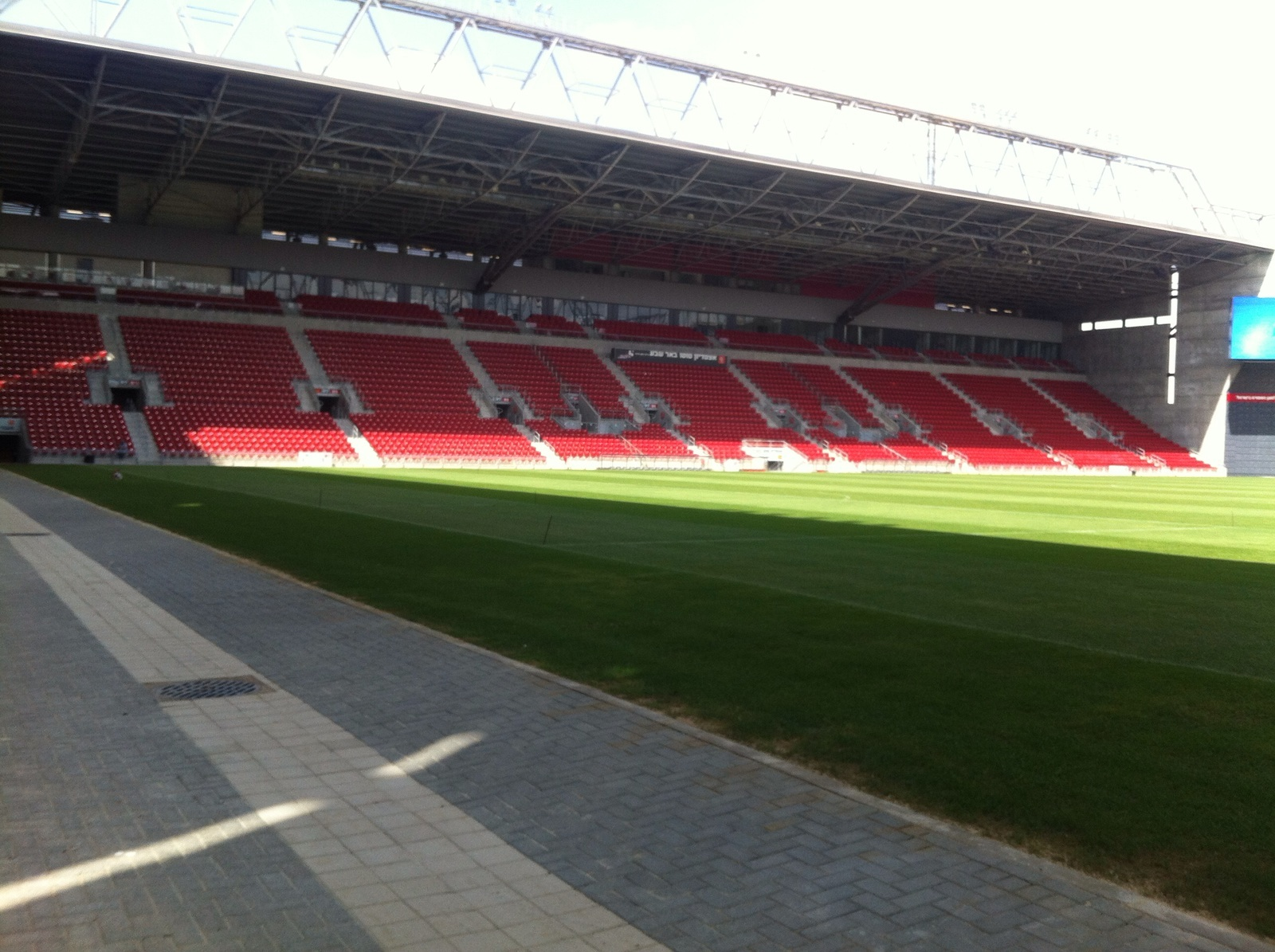
Turner Stadium of Be'er Sheva. The newest stadium of the Israel national team

On 16 September 2015, Turner Stadium opened for the first time to some 4,000 fans who watched the team public show practice. The first game hosted by the stadium took place on 21 September 2015 against Maccabi Haifa, and ended with a 0–0 draw. Before the game there was a dedication ceremony for a house and the setting of mezuzot in the presence of Mayor Rubik Danilovich.

=== Compound Vasermil ===
Be'er Sheva Municipality decided during 2015 to commemorate the legendary stadium named Arthur Vasermil that carries on a meaningful story.

This compound serves mainly the youth department groups Hapoel Be'er Sheva, but sometimes even the older group.

Compound five training facilities include a field with artificial turf as required by FIFA.

In 2013 the building was inaugurated "at the Association". The project includes 750 square meters of computer rooms, professional spaces, dressing rooms, doctor's room, coaches room, an area for gatherings, logistics and other rooms with modern elements of the most advanced in the country and meets all the standards of the Israel Football Association Premier leagues. There is a possibility of building another floor to the club in the future, to continue activities such as a football academy construction project.

== Fans ==
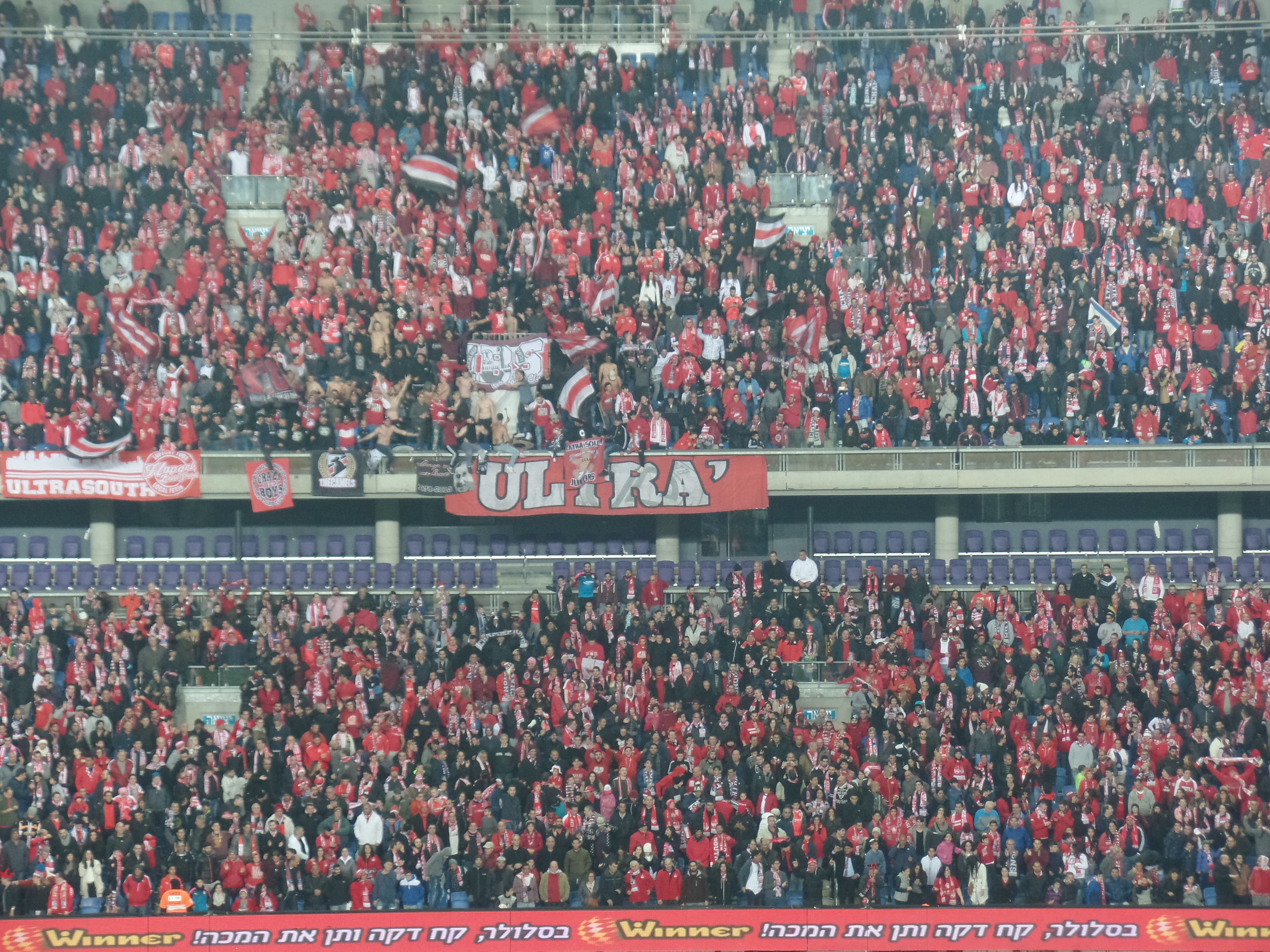
Hapoel Be'er Sheva supporters' stand, 2017

Hapoel Be'er Sheva fans spread throughout the country and are one of the largest audiences in Israel.

The 2012–13 season fans won the title of Be'er Sheva year's fair audience.

=== Ultras Organization – UltraSouth ===
UltraSouth was founded in 2014 out of a union between 2 groups – The Camels 2005 & and The South Side. Its activity was centered in Gate 5 at Vasermil Stadium. At Turner Stadium it runs behind the gate in the south gallery. The organization focuses on encouraging the group and preparing a stage for the games. In addition, the organization helps organize the fans of the group in ways of reaching out. Since the group moved to Turner Stadium, the organization has begun to present advanced sets of encouragement. In the 2016–17 season, the fans organization launched a fundraising campaign to purchase crankshafts for the southern pavilion to assist in the layout of the sets. The sum they sought to reach was 100,000 Shekels and the end of the campaign was about a month, but after 24 hours the money was raised in full. The organization advocated political isolation and the ultras of "ULTRAS NO POLITICA". The approach of the UltraSouth organization to avoid political affiliation turned out to be successful. After the display of Palestinian flags in Celtic Park, the organization emphasized that anyone who wanted to bring the Israeli flag to the tour was welcome, but it would not be related to the group.

The organization takes care to make flags and signs in high-level deployment to increase the standard of decor in the stands. There is a songwriter for the group and for the players. In addition, the organization is in regular contact with the fans through Facebook, a dedicated Telegram channel, and other social media.

== Crest ==
With the establishment of the club, it was decided by the management team that a crest, labeled below with Hapoel Be'er Sheva, would be placed on jerseys. This symbol has served the club until 1993.

In 1993 the club management decided to change the group crest, and because over the years the club had earned the nickname "Camel", the club tried to create a symbol for it. Between 1993 and 1995 the crest had a modified camel hump below, a soccer ball in the center circle, and the team name written in Hebrew and English at the edges.

From 1995 to 2016, Hapoel Be'er Sheva flaunted symbol whose lower half was a soccer ball, and the top half contained a chimney that symbolizes the municipal building, a symbol of the original executive, and the slogan "the pride of the Negev" to describe the team from the capital of the Negev.

On 21 June 2016 the club's management presented the official emblem at the 2016–17 season press conference. The current symbol is based on the symbol that served the club from the 1995–96 season to the 2015–16 season: the lower half circle shape is half a soccer ball, the top half contains a chimney symbolizing the municipal building, a symbol of the original executive, and the top edges of the circle display the club's Hebrew and English name. In addition, the crest is displayed below a star; this star represents that the club has won five championships.

Club crest from 1995–96 season to 2015–16 season

Club crest from 2016–17 season

== Kit manufacturers and sponsors ==
=== Kit manufacturers ===
The shirt and shorts of Hapoel Be'er Sheva have been red and white since its inception; the group's third costume is blue.

At some point in time, the team has added a rather black color. During the 1990s, the team also played in costumes that are not related to their traditional colors, such as a purple outfit, which represents the forum club that was then the main sponsor. The club's famous uniforms are red and white striped shirts, the first and second championship seasons.

The uniform of the team beginning with the 2023–24 season are made by the Umbro company. Over the years, Hapoel Be'er Sheva has used uniforms from Kappa, Adidas, Nike, Diadora, Lotto, Puma and Umbro.

Here are the manufacturers of team uniforms starting in 1975:

Period	Kit manufacturer
1975–1980	Umbro
1980–1983	Adidas
1983–1986	Umbro
1986–1995	Diadora
1995–1998	Lotto
1998–2000	Diadora
2000–2004	Kappa
2004–2005	Nike
2005–2008	Lotto
2008–2011	Diadora
2011–2016	Kappa
2016–2019	Puma
2019–2023	Kelme
2023–present	Umbro

=== Sponsors ===
Since its inception Hapoel Be'er Sheva has worked with a number of sponsors recognized locally as Solel Boneh in the 1980s, and the South Korean car company Kia and Forum Club at the beginning and middle of the decade.

Since 2022, the main sponsor has been Victory. Secondary Hapoel Be'er Sheva sponsors include the company Metropoline, Fattal Hotels, Kelme and Eurotec group.

Here are the main sponsors of the team from 2012:

Period	Shirt sponsor
2012–2015	O-Mobli
2015–2016	Get Stocks
2016–2020	Tadiran
2020–2022	Mahsanei HaShuk
2022–present	Victory

== Honours, records and achievements ==
=== Honours ===
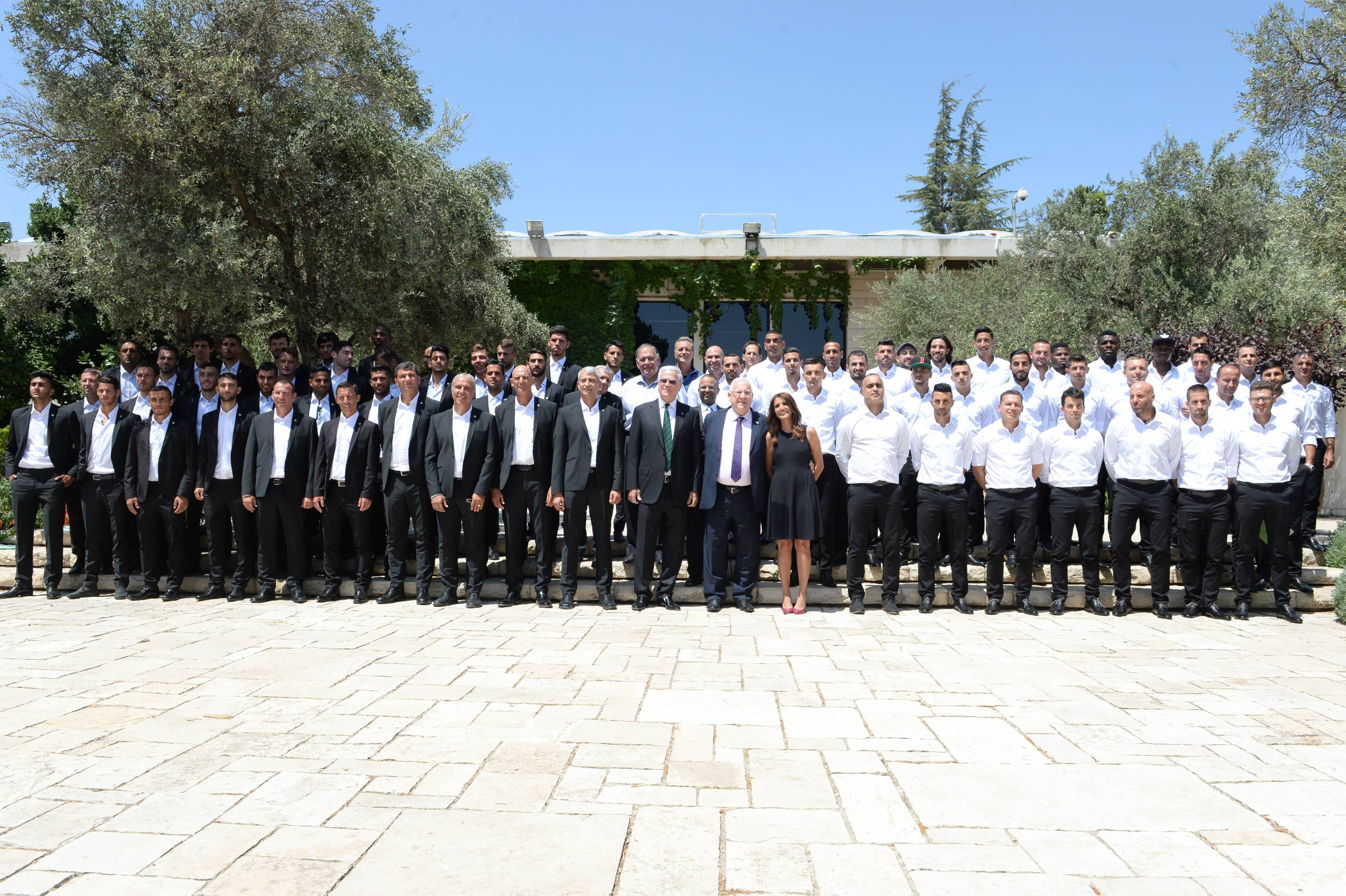
President of Israel Reuven Rivlin, with both teams participating in State Cup, Maccabi Haifa and Hapoel Be'er Sheva. August 2016

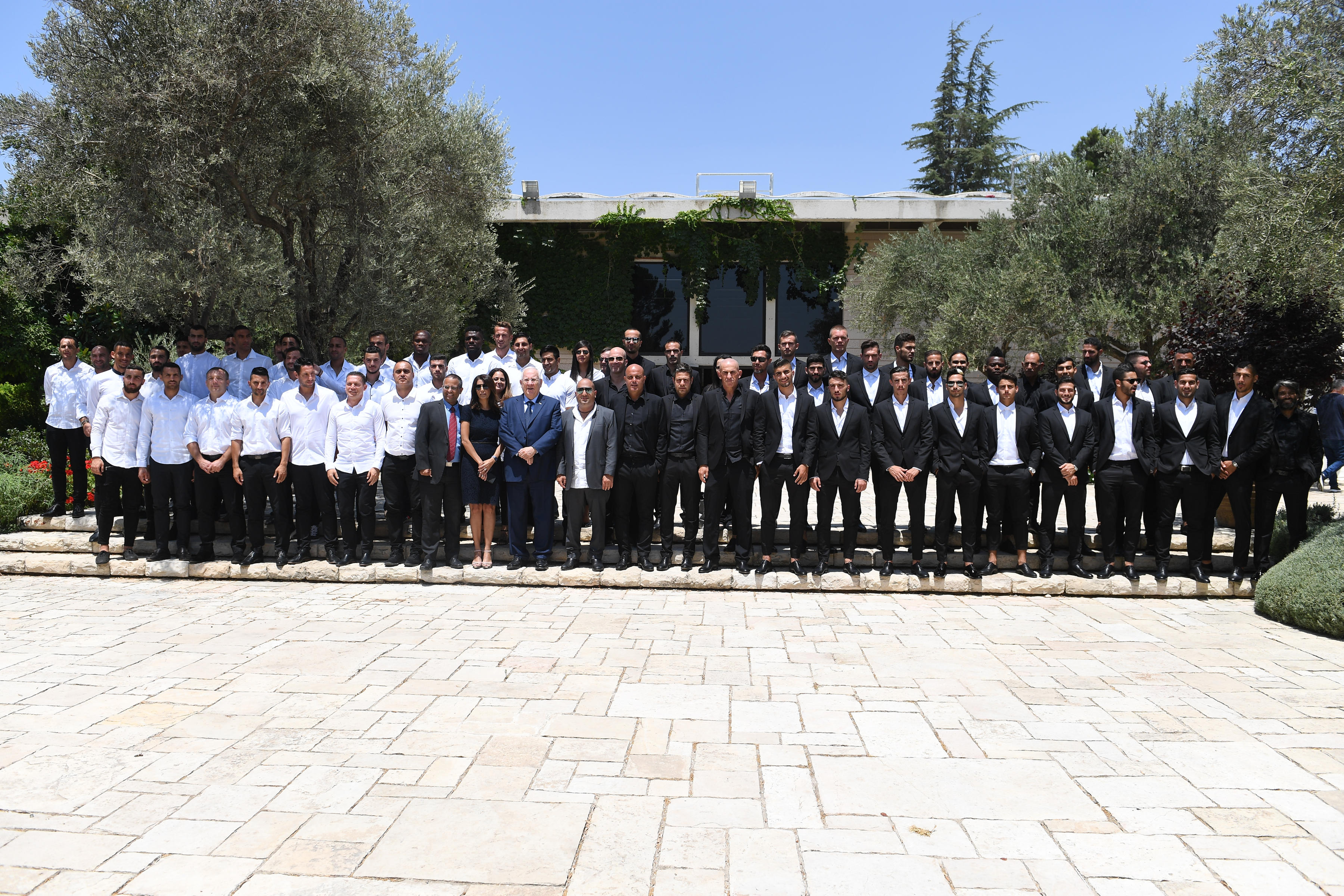
Israeli champions Hapoel Be'er Sheva and Israel State Cup holders Bnei Yehuda in a team photo with the President of Israel at the "Magen HaKavod" award ceremony for the 2016–17 season, August 2017

- Premier League:
  - Winners (6): 1974–75, 1975–76, 2015–16, 2016–17, 2017–18, 2025–26
  - Runners-up (4): 2013–14, 2021–22, 2022–23, 2024–25
- Second League:
  - Winners (3): 1964–65, 1970–71, 2000–01
- State Cup:
  - Winners (4): 1996–97, 2019–20, 2021–22, 2024–25
  - Runners-up (5): 1983–84, 2002–03, 2014–15, 2023–24, 2025–26
- Super Cup:
  - Winners (5): 1975, 2016, 2017, 2022, 2025
  - Runners-up (4): 1976, 2018, 2020, 2026
- Super Cup (Second League):
  - Winners (1): 1970–71
- Toto Cup:
  - Winners (3): 1988–89, 1995–96, 2016–17
  - Runners-up (5): 1985–86, 2012–13, 2017–18, 2021–22, 2022–23
- Toto Cup (Second League):
  - Winners (1): 2008–09
  - Runners-up (1): 2005–06
- Lilian Cup:
  - Winners (1): 1988
  - Runners-up (2): 1982, 1983

=== Team records ===
- Seasons in top division – 53 (Includes season 2026–27)
- The first group in the history of Israeli football that played in a European competition (together with Beitar Jerusalem, 1976–77)
- The first team in the history of Israeli football who played in the UEFA Cup (together with Hapoel Tel Aviv, 1994–95)
- The highest victory of an Israeli team in the semi-finals of the Israel State Cup – 0–7 (against Hapoel Afula, 2014–15)
- The biggest loss of an Israeli team in a European competition – 0–10 (against Roda JC, 1997–98)
- Biggest 'undefeated' streak in the league – 29 (09/05/16 – 03/10/15)
- Biggest 'undefeated away matches' streak in the league – 14 (25/04/16 – 16/10/15)
- Record League – Home Games without loss – 51 (12/05/18 – 21/09/15)
- Record of wins for a season – 26 (2016–17)
- Record consecutive victories – 10 (2016–17)
- Record of home victories for a single season – 16 (2016–17)
- Record consecutive home victories – 10 (22/02/16 – 03/10/15)
- Record consecutive away victories – 7 (25/04/16 – 16/01/16)
- Record losses for the season – 21 (1966–68)
- Record goals for the season – 73 (2016–17)
- Record goals for the season at home – 45 (2016–17)
- Record of gate absorption for the Season – 62 (1966–68)
- The low gate absorption for the season – 18 (2016–17)
- Record of league minutes without conceding a goal – 450 (1996–97)
- Biggest league goals difference in a single season – 55 (2016–17)
- Most points in a season – 85 (2016–17)

=== Personal records ===
- Highest number of league appearances: Shlomo Iluz, 515 performances
- Top league scorer: Shalom Avitan, 100 goals
- Most goals in a single season: Hisham Zuabi in 1992–93 season, 17 goals
- Most Assists in a single season: Maor Buzaglo (2013–14 season) and Maor Melikson (2015–16 season), 14 Assists
- Most goals in European competitions in a single season: Anthony Nwakaeme (2015–2018), 8 goals
- Highest number of European competition appearances: Miguel Vítor (2016–Present), 60 performances

==== Most appearances ====
- The 10 players with the most appearances in the club's history, with a minimum of 200 appearances.

#	Name	Games	Period
1	Shlomo Iluz	515	1977–1996
2	Eliyahu Offer	450	1959–1978
3	Stav Elimelech	431	1987–1997, 1998–2005
4	Rafi Eliyahu	419	1966–1984
5	Meir Barad	344	1966–1977, 1978–1982
6	Shalom Avitan	251	1972–1973, 1975–1980, 1981–1985
7	Evyatar Iluz	249	2001–2005, 2006–2015
8	Maor Melikson	230	2008–2011, 2014–2020
9	Miguel Vítor	229	2016–
10	Elyaniv Barda	207	1998–2003, 2013–2018

==== Most league goals ====
- The 10 players with the most goals in the club's history, with a minimum of 50 goals.

#	Name	Goals	Period
1	Shalom Avitan	100	1972–1973, 1975–1980, 1981–1985
2	Meir Barad	80	1966–1977, 1978–1982
3	Rafi Eliyahu	66	1966–1984
4	Eliyahu Offer	64	2059–2076
5	Avraham Numa	64	1964–1978
6	Ben Sahar	62	2015–2020
7	Efraim Tzvi	55	1968–1980
8	Elyaniv Barda	53	1998–2003, 2013–2018

==== Won the title of top scorer of the Premier League ====
Season	Name	Goals	Notes
2003–04	Ofir Haim	16	Together with Shay Holtzman from Ashdod
2018–19	Ben Sahar	15	–

==== Won the title of footballer this season ====
- The players have won seven times in the Israeli Premier League this season, according to the following table:

Season	Name	Group titles	Notes
1966–68	Avraham Numa	–	Maariv footballer of the year
1973–74	Meir Barad	–	Yedioth Ahronoth footballer of the year
1974–75	Uri Benjamin	Championship	Maariv footballer of the year
2015–16	Elyaniv Barda	Championship	"Leagues Manager" and "ONE" footballer of the year
2016–17	Miguel Vítor	Championship, Super Cup and Toto Cup	"Leagues Manager" footballer of the year
2017–18	Hanan Maman	Championship	"Leagues Manager" footballer of the year
2025–26	Kings Kangwa	Championship and Super Cup	"Leagues Manager" and "ONE" footballer of the year

== Hapoel Be'er Sheva in Europe ==
=== UEFA team ranking ===
- Bold row-separators indicate change of ranking system.
- Italic font indicate ongoing season.

Season	Rank	T.Points	S.Points	Ref.
2025–26	117 ▼	14.000	1.500	
2024–25	109 ▼	16.500	2.000	
2023–24	99 ▼	17.000	2.000	
2022–23	93 ▲	17.000	6.000	
2021–22	109 ▼	14.000	2.500	
2020–21	91 ▲	17.500	4.000	
2019–20	106 ▲	14.000	2.500	
2018–19	109 ▲	12.000	2.000	
2017–18	122 ▲	10.000	3.000	
2016–17	150 ▲	10.875	7.350	
2015–16	275 ▲	4.725	0.950	
2014–15	278 ▲	4.700	0.775	

- Last updated:18 February 2026

European achievements:

Champions league:

- Qualifying (4): 2016–17, 2017–18, 2018–19

Europa league

- Last 32 (1): 2016–17
- Group stage (2): 2017–18, 2020–21
- First round (1): 1995–96
- Qualifying (6): 1994–95, 2014–15, 2015–16, 2018–19, 2019–20, 2025–26

Conference league:

- Group stage (1): 2022–23
- Qualifying (4): 2021–22, 2023–24, 2024–25, 2025–26

European cup winners cup:

- First round (1): 1997–98

Intertoto Cup:

- Group stage (2): 1976, 1994
- First round (1): 2004

== Players ==
=== Current squad ===
As of 7 November 2026

Note: Flags indicate national team as defined under FIFA eligibility rules; some limited exceptions apply. Players may hold more than one non-FIFA nationality.

No.	Pos.	Nation	Player
1	GK	ISR	Ofir Marciano
2	DF	ISR	Guy Mizrahi
3	DF	ISR	Matan Baltaxa
4	DF	ISR	Miguel Vítor (captain)
5	DF	POR	Pedro Amador
7	MF	ISR	Eliel Peretz
8	MF	ISR	Mohammed Kna'an
9	FW	ISR	Zahi Ahmed
10	MF	ISR	Dan Bitton (Vice-captain)
11	MF	ISR	Amir Ganah
12	DF	ISR	Itay Rotman
13	DF	ISR	Ofir Davidzada
14	FW	ISR	Yonas Malede
15	DF	ISR	Idan Nachmias

No.	Pos.	Nation	Player
17	MF	GHA	Amankwah Forson (on loan from Norwich City)
19	FW	ISR	Amit Ohana
20	FW	JAM	Javon East
25	MF	BRA	Lucas Ventura
27	MF	BUL	Yoni Stoyanov
28	MF	ISR	Niv Yehoshua
34	GK	ARG	Marco Wolff
36	GK	ISR	Yonatan Shani
44	DF	SEN	Djibril Diop
45	FW	ISR	Muhammad Abu Rumi
66	FW	SRB	Igor Zlatanović
70	FW	BRA	João Victor
90	FW	PER	Adrián Ugarriza

=== Players under contract ===
Note: Flags indicate national team as defined under FIFA eligibility rules; some limited exceptions apply. Players may hold more than one non-FIFA nationality.

No.	Pos.	Nation	Player
—	FW	ISR	Noam Shahar

=== Out on loan ===
No.	Pos.	Nation	Player
—	DF	ISR	Yoni El Malem (at (Israel) Hapoel Acre until 30 June 2027)
—	MF	ISR	Amir Sabag (at (Israel) Ironi Modi'in until 30 June 2027)
—	MF	ISR	Ofek Peretz (at (Israel) Hapoel Kfar Saba until 30 June 2027)
—	MF	ISR	Ilay Sakuri (at (Israel) Maccabi Kiryat Gat until 30 June 2027)
—	FW	ISR	Samer Farhud (at (Israel) Ironi Tiberias until 30 June 2027)
—	FW	ISR	Niv Vaknin (at (Israel) Hapoel Kfar Saba until 30 June 2027)
—	FW	ISR	Yoav Koren (at (Israel) Maccabi Petah Tikva until 30 June 2027)

No.	Pos.	Nation	Player
—	DF	ISR	Roy Levy (at (Israel) Hapoel Petah Tikva until 30 June 2027)
—	MF	ISR	Itay Hazut (at (Israel) FC Ashdod until 30 June 2027)
—	GK	ISR	Niv Eliasi (at (Greece) Levadiakos until 30 June 2027)
—	GK	ISR	Ben Gordin (at (Israel) Hapoel Jerusalem until 30 June 2027)
—	GK	ISR	Itay Hemi (at (Israel) FC Kiryat Yam until 30 June 2027)
—	GK	ISR	Reem Golan (at (Israel) Maccabi Kiryat Gat until 30 June 2027)
—	FW	ISR	Mor Siman Tov (at (Israel) Ironi Kiryat Shmona until 30 June 2027)

=== Retired numbers ===
Note: Flags indicate national team as defined under FIFA eligibility rules; some limited exceptions apply. Players may hold more than one non-FIFA nationality.

No.	Pos.	Nation	Player
6	FW	ZAM	Chaswe Nsofwa

=== Foreigner players for 2026–27 season ===
Only up to eight non-Israeli nationals may be registered in an Israeli club's squad. Players who have competed in Israel for an extended period (such as Miguel Vítor) may obtain Israeli citizenship or permanent residency status, allowing them to be registered and compete as domestic players.

- (Brazil) Lucas Ventura
- (Serbia) Igor Zlatanović
- (Senegal) Djibril Diop
- (Jamaica) Javon East
- (Brazil) João Victor
- (Portugal) Pedro Amador
- (Peru) Adrián Ugarriza
- (Ghana) Amankwah Forson

=== Professional staff ===
Position	Staff
Head coach	(Israel) Ran Kozuch
Assistant Head coach	(Israel) Ben Binyamin
Goalkeeping coach	(Israel) Sheila Miara
Fitness coach	(Israel) Michael Brosh

== Coaches ==
The following table presents the club's head coaches over the past ten seasons and includes details on the manager in charge in each campaign, as well as the team's achievements in the league, the state cup, and other competitions.

- Last updated:29 May 2026

Season	Name	Honours
2016–17	Barak Bakhar	League: 1 State Cup: 0 Super/Toto Cup: 2
2017–18	Barak Bakhar	League: 1 State Cup: 0 Super/Toto Cup: 1
2018–19	Barak Bakhar	League: 0 State Cup: 0 Super/Toto Cup: 0
2019–20	Barak Bakhar; Yossi Abukasis	League: 0 State Cup: 1 Super/Toto Cup: 0
2020–21	Yossi Abukasis; Ronny Levi	League: 0 State Cup: 0 Super/Toto Cup: 0
2021–22	Ronny Levi; Elyaniv Barda	League: 0 State Cup: 1 Super/Toto Cup: 0
2022–23	Elyaniv Barda	League: 0 State Cup: 0 Super/Toto Cup: 1
2023–24	Elyaniv Barda	League: 0 State Cup: 0 Super/Toto Cup: 0
2024–25	Ran Kozuch	League: 0 State Cup: 1 Super/Toto Cup: 0
2025–26	Ran Kozuch	League: 1 State Cup: 0 Super/Toto Cup: 1

- See also: List of Hapoel Be’er Sheva managers with Wikipedia articles

== Notable players in the club’s history ==
The ten most prominent players, per category, based on the ratio between titles won and appearances, taking into account the significance of the club's achievements.

Homegrown players

#	Name
1	Elyaniv Barda
2	Dan Bitton
3	Eliyahu Offer
4	Rafi Eliyahu
5	Meir Barad
6	Avraham Numa
7	Efraim Zvi
8	Alon Ben Dor
9	Moshe Abugazir
10	Uri Benjamin

Signed players

#	Name
1	Maor Melikson
2	Ben Bitton
3	Ben Sahar
4	Shir Tzedek
5	Loai Taha
6	Maharan Radi
7	David Goresh
8	Maor Buzaglo
9	Ronnie Moskovich
10	Shai Elias

Foreign players

#	Name
1	(Portugal) Miguel Vítor
2	(Nigeria) John Ogu
3	(Nigeria) Tony Nwakaeme
4	(Romania) Ovidiu Hoban
5	(Hungary) Mihály Korhut
6	(Brazil) William Soares
7	(Portugal) Hélder Lopes
8	(Zambia) Kings Kangwa
9	(Brazil) Lucas Ventura
10	(Serbia) Igor Zlatanović

- See also: List of Hapoel Be'er Sheva players with Wikipedia articles

== Season by season ==
The following table provides information on the season, league, place, and state cup performance over the last thirteen years.

- Last updated:29 May 2026

Season	Tier	Division	Place	State Cup
2013–14	1	Premier League	2nd	Semi Final
2014–15	1	Premier League	3rd	Final
2015–16	1	Premier League	1st	Semi Final
2016–17	1	Premier League	1st	Round of 16
2017–18	1	Premier League	1st	Quarter Final
2018–19	1	Premier League	3rd	Round of 16
2019–20	1	Premier League	4th	Won
2020–21	1	Premier League	4th	Eighth Round
2021–22	1	Premier League	2nd	Won
2022–23	1	Premier League	2nd	Eighth Round
2023–24	1	Premier League	3rd	Final
2024–25	1	Premier League	2nd	Won
2025–26	1	Premier League	1st	Final

- See also: List of Hapoel Be’er Sheva seasons with Wikipedia articles

== Youth department ==
Hapoel "Hashlosha" Be'er Sheva, which represents the country's main southern football, and one of the largest youth departments in Israel.

During most of the club's years, the club enjoys a strong youth department. Until 1969 Hapoel Be'er Sheva had one youth team, and it even won the first Israeli Youth Championship this year. At the end of the championship season, another group, Hapoel "Hashlosha", was established in Be'er Sheva after three employees of the "Makhteshim" factory who died in a work accident. The "Hashlosha" coach was Haim Sneh and within a short time the "Hashlosha" became the senior youth group in the city. "Hashlosha" won the first Israeli youth championship in 1973–74.

Until the end of the 1980s "HaShlosha" Be'er Sheva was regularly ranked in the top ranks of the Youth Super League and even won four State Youth Championships. From the mid-1960s, Be'er Sheva youth teams relied on the talents discovered in the municipal youth leagues, founded by Aharon Ben Yaakov, who in their heyday numbered thousands of boys who played in hundreds of teams.

As the group moved into private hands in the 1990s, the investment in the youth department declined and the youth group dropped to the re-election after a few years. Since 2007, when Alona Barkat has purchased the club, many funds have been invested to bring the youth departments back to the forefront.

=== Honours ===
Youth Israeli champions (4)
1969–70, 1973–74, 1975–76, 1984–85

Youth Super League (1)
1984–85

== In popular culture ==
The title character of the Israeli sitcom Shemesh, is a devoted supporter of the club, and the club appears in the show's main setting and is mentioned several times throughout the show.

The love for Hapoel Be'er Sheva is at the center of Asher Halperin book, "I was crazy about it: a story about love and football."
