= Guy Azouri =

Israeli football manager

Guy Azouri גיא עזורי
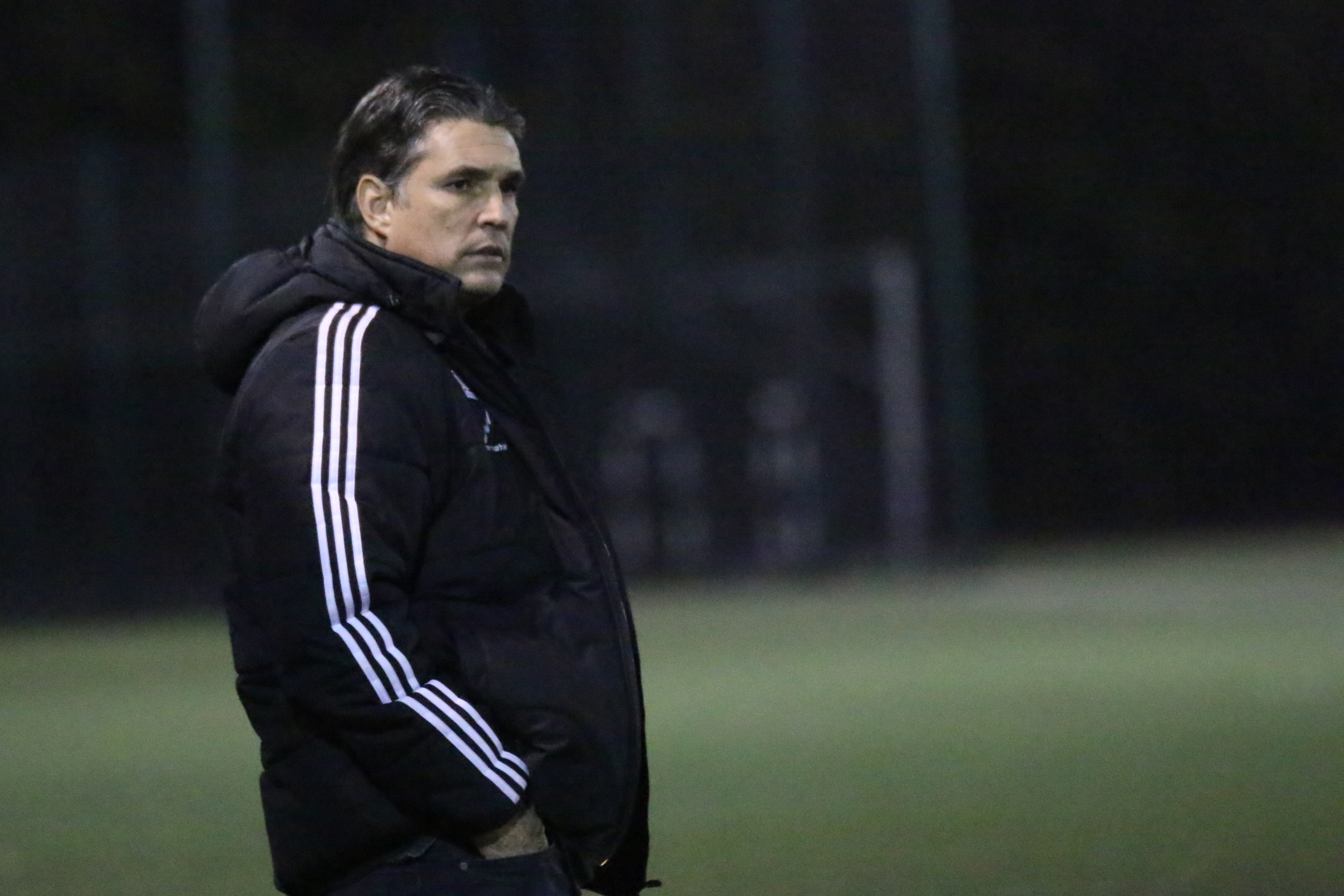
- Guy Azouri in 2016.

Personal information
- Full name: Guy Azouri
- Date of birth: 2 June 1963 (age 63)
- Place of birth: Israel

Team information
- Current team: Israeli Women’s National Football Team (manager)

Youth career
- Maccabi Tel Aviv

Senior career*
Years	Team	Apps	(Gls)
1985–1989	LIU Post Pioneers		

Managerial career
- 2005: Beitar Jerusalem
- 2005–2006: Beitar Jerusalem (assistant)
- 2006–2008: Beitar Jerusalem (youth)
- 2008: Maccabi Petah Tikva
- 2009–2010: Hapoel Be'er Sheva
- 2010–2011: Hapoel Ashkelon
- 2011: Hapoel Kfar Saba
- 2013–: Israel Women's U19 and U17
- * Club domestic league appearances and goals

Guy Azouri (Hebrew: גיא עזורי; born 2 June 1963) is an Israeli football manager. He is currently the head coach of the Israeli National Women's Football team, and the head of the Israeli Women's Football Academy.

After playing as a youth in the Maccabi Tel Aviv youth team, Azouri spent most of his football career as a player in the United States. After an injury Azouri turned to coaching, serving as assistant coach under Avram Grant and Eli Ohana.

Azouri moved to Beitar Jerusalem in 2005 as Eli Ohana's assistant coach. After Ohana's departure he became interim head coach for 5 months, proving to be very successful. After Luis Fernández was brought in as head coach Azouri returned to the assistant coach position, and finally following Fernandez's departure Azouri took over as the coach of Beitar's under-20 team, winning an historic Double in the 2006–07 season and another Championship the following year.

Beginning in 2008 Azouri served as head coach of several teams in the Israeli Premier League, including Beitar Jerusalem, Hapoel Be'er Sheva and Maccabi Petach-Tikvah.

In 2012 Azouri was one of the founders of Israel's Women Football Academy, which has won accolades for the improvements it has achieved in women's football, culminating in hosting the 2015 U-19 championship .

Today Azouri is the director and head coach of the Israeli Women's Football Academy, which includes the Adult, U-19 and youth teams.

== Youth ==
Guy Azouri was born in 1963 in Tel Aviv. He joined the Maccabi Tel Aviv youth club when he was 8, and played there continuously until his career was put on hold when he joined the Israeli Army at age 18. After completing his service in 1985, Azouri traveled to the United States to study Physical Fitness and Physiology at Long Island University. While there he played under scholarship for LIU Post Pioneers as a midfielder. Azouri also coached several youth teams during this period. In 1990 Azouri was invited to try out for a position in the NY Jets due to his impressive kicking ability. At one of these tryouts Azouri was seriously injured in the groin, thereby ending his career as a professional athlete.

== Career ==
=== Men's Football Assistant Coach ===
In 1994 Azouri returned to Israel, taking up a position as assistant coach in Maccabi Tel Aviv under Avram Grant. The two developed close professional ties during this time. Maccabi Tel Aviv, under Grant and Azouri, won Liga Leumit (than top division) in the first season, with 13 points advantage over second place. In 2000 Azouri joined Bnei Yehuda as assistant to Eli Ohana. Azouri followed Ohana when the latter became head coach of Beitar Jerusalem in 2002. After Eli Ohana resigned in September 2005, he was replaced by Guy Azouri as interim coach. Although Azouri enjoyed the highest success rate of any coach in the Premier League during this time, he did not have a UEFA Pro Manager diploma, and so could not continue as permanent head coach. Beitar signed the Dutch Ton Caanen as a coach, Guy Azouri was demoted to assistant coach. Azouri also served as an assistant coach to Fernández who resigned at the end of the season.

=== U-20 Coach ===
In the summer of 2006 Beitar signed the Argentinian manager Osvaldo Ardiles who brought his own professional team and so was not interested in Azouri staying on as assistant manager . Azouri decided to train the Beitar U-20 team, which went on to win the Double (Championship and Youth Cup) the first time in its history. The club later won another championship under his guidance.

=== Men's football head coach ===
In the years 2008-2011 Azouri was head coach at a number of Premier League clubs including Maccabi Petah-Tikvah, Hapoel Be'er Sheva and Hapoel Ashkelon.

=== Women's Football Coaching Career ===
In 2012 Azouri was one of the founders of the Israeli Women's Football Academy, an international academy modelled on European lines. The academy is considered highly successful, with the U-19 women's team participating in the Championship for the first time in its history in the 2015 tournament, which was hosted in Israel. Today Azouri is the head coach of both the adult and U-19 teams, as well as the director of the youth academy.

== Personal life ==
Guy Azouri is married and has three children. He currently resides in Herzliya, Israel.

== Honours ==
- Israeli Youth Championship:
  - Winner (2): 2006–07, 2007–08
- Youth State Cup:
  - Winner (1): 2006–07
- Israeli Premier League Championship (as assistant coach to Avram Grant in Maccabi TA):
  - Winner (1): 1994-95
