= Avraham Lev =

Israeli footballer (born 1948)

Avraham Lev אברהם לב
Personal information
- Date of birth: 24 August 1948 (age 78)
- Position: Defender

International career
Years	Team	Apps	(Gls)
- Israel

Avraham Lev (Hebrew: אברהם לב; born 24 August 1948) is an Israeli former footballer. He competed in the men's tournament at the 1976 Summer Olympics.
