= Shalom Avitan =

Israeli footballer

Shalom Avitan שלום אביטן
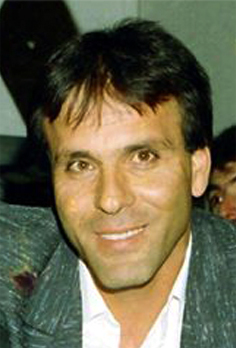

Personal information
- Full name: Shalom Avitan
- Date of birth: 9 January 1951 (age 75)
- Place of birth: Marseille, France
- Height: 1.79 m (5 ft 10 1/2 in)
- Position: Striker

Youth career
- Beitar Be'er Sheva

Senior career*
Years	Team	Apps	(Gls)
1967–1972	Beitar Be'er Sheva	38	(9)
1972–1973	Hapoel Be'er Sheva	15	(1)
1973–1975	Beitar Jerusalem	50	(11)
1975–1980	Hapoel Be'er Sheva	138	(53)
1980–1981	Hapoel Jerusalem	25	(5)
1981–1985	Hapoel Be'er Sheva	98	(46)
1985–1986	Hapoel Tel Aviv	8	(1)
1986–1987	Hapoel Ashdod		

International career^{‡}
1978	Israel	2	(2)
- * Club domestic league appearances and goals ‡ National team caps and goals as of 27 July 2015

Shalom Avitan (Hebrew: שלום אביטן; 9 January 1951 - 19 April 2024) was an Israeli professional footballer who played for Hapoel Be'er Sheva.

== Honours ==
=== Club ===
Hapoel Be'er Sheva

- Premier League:
  - Winners (1): 1975/1976
  - Third place (1): 1982/1983
- State Cup:
  - Runners-up (1): 1983/1984
- Super Cup:
  - Runners-up (1): 1975/1976
- Lillian Cup:
  - Runners-up (2): 1982, 1983

Hapoel Tel Aviv

- Premier League:
  - Winners (1): 1985/1986
