= Uri Benjamin =

Israeli footballer

Uri Benjamin אורי בנימין
Personal information
- Full name: Uri Benjamin
- Date of birth: 11 March 1954 (age 72)
- Place of birth: Be'er Sheva, Israel
- Height: 1.78 m (5 ft 10 in)
- Position: Right back

Youth career
- Hapoel Be'er Sheva

Senior career*
Years	Team	Apps	(Gls)
1973–1980	Hapoel Be'er Sheva		
- * Club domestic league appearances and goals as of 27 July 2015

Uri Benjamin (Hebrew: אורי בנימין; born 11 March 1954) is an Israeli former professional footballer that has played in Hapoel Be'er Sheva

== Honours ==
=== Club ===
Hapoel Be'er Sheva

- Premier League:
  - Winners (2): 1974/1975, 1975/1976
- Super Cup:
  - Winners (1): 1974/1975
  - Runners-up (1): 1975/1976
