= Amatsia Levkovich =

Israeli footballer (1937–2021)

Amatsia Levkovich 'אמציה לבקוביץ
Personal information
- Date of birth: 27 December 1937
- Place of birth: Tel Aviv, Mandatory Palestine
- Date of death: 4 November 2021 (aged 83)
- Position: Defender

Senior career*
Years	Team	Apps	(Gls)
1954–1969	Hapoel Tel Aviv		

International career
1957–1965	Israel	42	(1)

Managerial career
- 1970–1971: Israel U19 (assistant)
- 1970–1973: Hapoel Jerusalem
- 1974–1976: Hapoel Be'er Sheva
- 1979–1980: Hapoel Be'er Sheva
- 1980–1981: Hapoel Petah Tikva
- 1981–1988: Sierra Leone
- 1988–1990: Maccabi Haifa
- 1992–1993: Bnei Yehuda
- 1993–1994: Hapoel Haifa
- 1994: Beitar Jerusalem
- * Club domestic league appearances and goals

Amatsia Levkovich (Hebrew: 'אמציה לבקוביץ; 27 December 1937 – 4 November 2021) was an Israeli footballer who played as a defender for Hapoel Tel Aviv. He made 42 appearances for the Israel national team from 1957 to 1965.
