= Alon Ben Dor =

Israeli footballer

Alon Ben Dor אלון בן-דור
Personal information
- Date of birth: 18 March 1952 (age 74)
- Place of birth: Dorot, Israel
- Height: 1.82 m (5 ft 11 1/2 in)
- Position: Center back

Youth career
- Hapoel Be'er Sheva

Senior career*
Years	Team	Apps	(Gls)
1969–1979	Hapoel Be'er Sheva		
1979–1982	Beitar Be'er Sheva		
1982–1984	Hapoel Ashkelon		
1984–1985	Hapoel Marmorek		

International career
1976	Israel	10	(0)
- * Club domestic league appearances and goals

Alon Ben Dor (Hebrew: אלון בן-דור; born 18 March 1952) is an Israeli footballer. He competed in the men's tournament at the 1976 Summer Olympics.
