= Eliyahu Offer =

Israeli footballer (1944–2022)

Eliyahu Offer אליהו עופר
Personal information
- Date of birth: 1 June 1944
- Place of birth: Tripoli, Allied-occupied Libya
- Date of death: 15 December 2022 (aged 78)
- Place of death: Omer, Israel
- Height: 1.75 m (5 ft 9 in)
- Position: Defensive midfielder

Youth career
- Hapoel Be'er Sheva

Senior career*
Years	Team	Apps	(Gls)
1959–1978	Hapoel Be'er Sheva		

Managerial career
- 1977–1979: Hapoel Be'er Sheva
- 1980–1981: Hapoel Be'er Sheva
- 1981–1983: Beitar Jerusalem
- 1983–1984: Hapoel Be'er Sheva
- 1984–1985: Hapoel Jerusalem
- 1985–1986: Maccabi Sha'arayim
- 1986–1987: Maccabi Yavne
- 1988: Beitar Jerusalem
- 1989–1990: Hapoel Tel Aviv
- 1990–1992: Hapoel Be'er Sheva
- 1993–1994: Hapoel Jerusalem
- 1998–1999: Hapoel Be'er Sheva
- 1999: Hapoel Jerusalem
- 1999: Hapoel Be'er Sheva
- 2012: Maccabi Be'er Sheva (General Manager)
- * Club domestic league appearances and goals

Eliyahu Offer (Hebrew: אליהו עופר; 1 June 1944 – 15 December 2022) was an Israeli football professional player and manager. He played as a defensive midfielder for Hapoel Be'er Sheva and managed the club in multiple stints.

== Personal life ==
Offer owned a successful restaurant in Be'er Sheva.

== Honours ==
- Premier League: 1974–75, 1975–76
- Super Cup: 1974–75; runner-up 1975–76
- Second League: 1970–71
- Super Cup Second League: 1970–71
