= Jacob Cohen (footballer) =

Israeli footballer

Jacob Cohen יעקב כהן
Personal information
- Full name: Jacob Cohen
- Date of birth: 25 September 1956 (age 70)
- Place of birth: Be'er Sheva, Israel
- Height: 1.75 m (5 ft 9 in)
- Position: Left back

Youth career
- Hapoel Be'er Sheva

Senior career*
Years	Team	Apps	(Gls)
1974–1980	Hapoel Be'er Sheva		
1980–1982	Brighton & Hove Albion	6	(0)
1982–1983	Beitar Tel Aviv		
1983–1984	Maccabi Tel Aviv	28	(0)
1984–1986	Hapoel Tel Aviv	40	(0)
1986–1989	Maccabi Petah Tikva		

International career^{‡}
1976–1981	Israel	19	(1)
- * Club domestic league appearances and goals ‡ National team caps and goals as of 27 July 2015

Jacob Cohen (Hebrew: יעקב כהן; born 25 September 1956) is an Israeli former professional footballer that has played in several clubs throughout Europe, including Hapoel Be'er Sheva, Brighton & Hove Albion, Maccabi Tel Aviv, and Hapoel Tel Aviv.

== Playing career ==
Cohen was bought by Brighton & Hove Albion from Hapoel Be'er Sheva for £40,000 in October 1980, but had made only six appearances.

== Honours ==
=== Club ===
Hapoel Be'er Sheva

- Premier League:
  - Winners (2): 1974/1975, 1975/1976
- Super Cup:
  - Winners (1): 1974/1975
  - Runners-up (1): 1975/1976

Hapoel Tel Aviv

- Premier League:
  - Winners (1): 1985/1986
