= Rafi Eliyahu =

Israeli footballer

Rafi Eliyahu רפי אליהו
Personal information
- Full name: Rafi 'Rafhael' Eliyahu
- Date of birth: 8 May 1951 (age 75)
- Place of birth: Be'er Sheva, Israel
- Height: 1.75 m (5 ft 9 in)
- Position: Attacking midfielder

Youth career
- Hapoel Be'er Sheva

Senior career*
Years	Team	Apps	(Gls)
1966–1984	Hapoel Be'er Sheva	419	(66)

International career^{‡}
1975	Israel	2	(0)
- * Club domestic league appearances and goals as of 27 July 2015 ‡ National team caps and goals as of 27 July 2015

Rafi Eliyahu (Hebrew: רפי אליהו; born 8 May 1951) is an Israeli former professional footballer that has played in Hapoel Be'er Sheva.

== Honours ==
=== Club ===
Hapoel Be'er Sheva

- Premier League:
  - Winners (2): 1974/1975, 1975/1976
- State Cup:
  - Runners-up (3): 1983/1984
- Super Cup:
  - Winners (1): 1974/1975
  - Runners-up (1): 1975/1976
- Lillian Cup:
  - Runners-up (1): 1982, 1983
- Second League:
  - Winners (1): 1970/1971
- Super Cup Second League:
  - Winners (1): 1970/1971
