= Meir Barad =

Israeli footballer

Meir Barad מאיר ברד
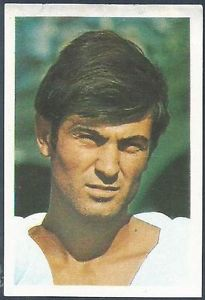

Personal information
- Full name: Meir Barad
- Date of birth: 7 November 1949 (age 76)
- Place of birth: Pardes Hanna, Israel
- Height: 1.77 m (5 ft 9 1/2 in)
- Position: Central midfielder

Youth career
- Hapoel Be'er Sheva

Senior career*
Years	Team	Apps	(Gls)
1966–1977	Hapoel Be'er Sheva	237	(66)
1977–1978	Hapoel Haifa	19	(4)
1978–1982	Hapoel Be'er Sheva	107	(14)
1982–1983	Hapoel Jerusalem	13	(1)

International career^{‡}
1969–1976	Israel	13	(0)
- * Club domestic league appearances and goals as of 27 July 2015 ‡ National team caps and goals as of 27 July 2015

Meir Barad (Hebrew: מאיר ברד; born 7 November 1949) is an Israeli former professional footballer that has played in Hapoel Be'er Sheva, he is of a Tunisian-Jewish descent.

== Honours ==
=== Club ===
Hapoel Be'er Sheva

- Premier League:
  - Winners (2): 1974/1975, 1975/1976
- Super Cup:
  - Winners (1): 1974/1975
  - Runners-up (1): 1975/1976
- Lillian Cup:
  - Runners-up (1): 1982
- Second League:
  - Winners (1): 1970/1971
- Super Cup Second League:
  - Winners (1): 1970/1971
