= Avraham Numa =

Israeli footballer (born 1947)

Avraham Numa אברהם נומא
Personal information
- Date of birth: 1947
- Place of birth: Iraq
- Date of death: January 2026 (aged 78–79)
- Height: 1.78 m (5 ft 10 in)
- Position: Forward

Youth career
- Hapoel Be'er Sheva

Senior career*
Years	Team	Apps	(Gls)
1964–1978	Hapoel Be'er Sheva		(64)
1978–1980	Beitar Be'er Sheva		

International career
- Israel national under-19
- * Club domestic league appearances and goals

Avraham Numa (Hebrew: אברהם נומא; 1947-January 2026) was a retired footballer who played as a forward for Hapoel Be'er Sheva in the 1960s and 1970s. In the 1966–68 season, he was Israeli Footballer of the Year. He won two premier league championships with Hapoel in the 1970s.

Numa played a total of 15 seasons in the Hapoel Be'er Sheva uniform and scored 64 goals in the top league. He stood out for his speed, his mobility in the front half of the court, his athleticism and his ability to pounce and hit. Numa is considered a "soul player" who sometimes used to excite the fans and sometimes to confront his friends on the field and even fans who teased him. He even played when he did not feel well.

== Family and childhood ==
Avraham Numa was born in Iraq to Salim and Nazima Numa and immigrated to Israel with his family in April 1951.

== Playing career ==
Numa began playing as a child in the Beersheba municipal leagues and rose through the ranks to the Hapoel first squad when he was 17. For most of his career he played as a striker and sometimes played other positions such as right midfielder.

In the 1966–68 season, Numa's team, Hapoel Be'er Sheva, prevailed twice over the Maccabi Tel Aviv team that did win the championship. In the second game, the away game, Numa opened the scoring; it was held in front of 6000 spectators at the Maccabiah Stadium in Tel Aviv and ended with a score of 0-3. At the end of this season, the longest season in the history of the prime league, he won the title of Israeli Footballer of the Year. A year later, although a weakened Hapoel Be'er Sheva finished in the 14th place, one place above relegation to the Liga Artzit, Numa finished in fourth place for footballer of the year in Israel.

During the 1970s, Numa finished several seasons as the top scorer of Hapoel Beer Sheva. At the end of the 1972–73 season, he scored three goals in the last home game of this season, against the Maccabi Haifa, helping his team win 2–4. He was a partner in the two championships that Hapoel Beer Sheva won in 1975 and 1976.

After the two championships, for the entire season of 1976–77, Numa was absent due to a serious injury and his team finished 13th, one place above relegation to the Liga Artzit. During the 1978–79 season, he changed sides to Beitar Be'er Sheva in the Liga Artzit, where he ended his player career in 1980.

== Managerial career ==
Upon retirement from active playing, Numa had a coaching career in youth departments at several clubs in Beersheba. In 21st century, Numa provides football clinics at Hapoel Beersheba.
