= Ya'akov Schwartz =

Israeli footballer

Ya'akov Schwartz יעקב שוורץ
Personal information
- Full name: Ya'akov Schwartz
- Date of birth: August 12, 1964 (age 62)
- Place of birth: Jerusalem, Israel
- Position: Midfielder

Youth career
- Beitar Jerusalem

Senior career*
Years	Team	Apps	(Gls)
1983–1994	Beitar Jerusalem	279	(35)
1994–1995	Hapoel Tel Aviv	30	(2)
1995–1996	Hapoel Be'er Sheva	6	(0)
1996	Maccabi Jaffa	10	(0)
1996–1998	Hapoel Lod		
1998–1999	Maccabi Netanya		

International career
1993–1994	Israel	8	(0)
- * Club domestic league appearances and goals

Ya'akov Schwartz (Hebrew: יעקב שוורץ) is a former Israeli footballer who represented the Israel national football team.

== Honours ==
- Israeli Championships
  - Winner (2): 1986–87, 1992–93
  - Runner-up (2): 1983–84, 1984–85
- State Cup
  - Winner (3): 1985, 1986, 1989
- Israeli Supercup
  - Winner (1): 1986
- Lilian Cup
  - Winner (1): 1985
