= David Amsalem =

Israeli footballer (born 1971)

David Amsalem דוד אמסלם
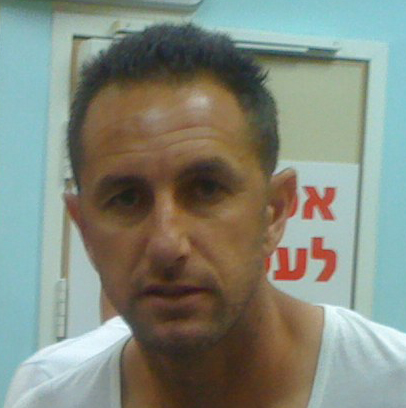

Personal information
- Date of birth: 4 September 1971 (age 55)
- Place of birth: Lod, Israel
- Position: Left-back

Youth career
- 1979–1983: Ayelat Lod
- 1984–1986: Hapoel Tel Aviv
- 1986–1990: Bnei Yehuda

Senior career*
Years	Team	Apps	(Gls)
1990–1993	Bnei Yehuda	59	(2)
1994–1995	Hapoel Tel Aviv	28	(1)
1995–1998	Beitar Jerusalem	85	(5)
1998–1999	Crystal Palace	10	(0)
1999–2000	Hapoel Haifa	35	(2)
2000–2009	Beitar Jerusalem	182	(7)

International career^{‡}
1991–1993	Israel U21	11	(1)
1992–1999	Israel	31	(0)

Managerial career
- 2009–2010: Beitar Jerusalem (assistant manager)
- 2010: Beitar Jerusalem
- 2010–2011: Beitar Jerusalem (assistant manager)
- 2011: Beitar Jerusalem
- 2013: Beitar Jerusalem (caretaker)
- 2013–2014: Beitar Jerusalem (assistant manager)
- * Club domestic league appearances and goals as of 21 May 2007 ‡ National team caps and goals as of 21 May 2007

David Amsalem (Hebrew: דוד אמסלם; born on 4 September 1971 in Israel) is an Israeli retired footballer.

== Career ==
He started his career with Bnei Yehuda and then joined Hapoel Tel Aviv whom he played for during the 1994–1995 season. He became the second Israeli to join Crystal Palace following Itzik Zohar who left just as Amsalem was signing.

Terry Venables signed Amsalem from Beitar Jerusalem for £800,000 in 1998 via a third party at a time when Amsalem was captain of the Israel national side. Controversy surrounded his signing as there were claims the money never reached Beitar. Beitar chairman Ehud Federman said that his contract had run out and had left the club on a free transfer.

He played for Beitar Jerusalem for three seasons 1995–1998. He started six games for Palace and played in a total of ten games for them. He was released from the club in 1999 and joined Hapoel Haifa who he played for until the end of the 1999–2000 season.

He made his return to Beitar Jerusalem in 2000 and played there for eight and a half seasons, until he retired in July 2009, to become assistant coach at the club.

== Honours ==
- Israeli Premier League (4):
  - 1996–97, 1997–98, 2006–07, 2007–08
- Toto Cup (1):
  - 1997–98
- Israel State Cup (2):
  - 2008, 2009
