= Zohar (name) =

Name list

Zohar (Hebrew: זהר or זוהר) is a Hebrew name meaning "splendor", "glow" or "radiance". It can be used either as a given name or a surname.

== Given name ==
- Zohar (biblical figure), a minor figure in the Hebrew Bible
- Zohar Argov (1955–1987), Israeli singer
- Zohar Liba (born 1977), Israeli actor
- Zohar Shavit (1951–2026), Israeli scholar, author and translator
- Zohar Shikler (born 1997), Israeli Olympic swimmer
- Zohar Zimro (born 1977), Israeli marathon runner

== Surname ==
- Avivi Zohar (born 1972), Israeli footballer
- Itzik Zohar (born 1970), Israeli footballer and television commentator
- Miki Zohar (born 1980), Israeli lawyer and politician
- Miriam Zohar (born 1931), Israeli actress
- Uri Zohar (1935–2022), Israeli film director and actor
- Yaniv Zohar, Israeli journalist

== Other ==
- Zohar, one of the two phantom torsos carried by the Artemis 1 mission

== See also ==
- Bar Zohar, a related name
- The Zohar, considered the most important work of Kabbalah
- The Zohar Tinyanah, considered a "second book" of the Zohar
