= Li On Mizrahi =

Israeli footballer

Li-On Mizrahi
Personal information
- Full name: Li-On Shimon Mizrahi
- Date of birth: 24 October 2002 (age 24)
- Place of birth: Jerusalem, Israel
- Position: Left back

Team information
- Current team: Hapoel Jerusalem
- Number: 18

Youth career
- 2009–2020: Beitar Jerusalem
- 2020–2021: Hapoel Tel Aviv

Senior career*
Years	Team	Apps	(Gls)
2021–2022	Hapoel Tel Aviv	1	(0)
2022–2025	Beitar Jerusalem	60	(1)
2025–2026	Maccabi Netanya	17	(0)
2026–	Hapoel Jerusalem	0	(0)

International career^{‡}
2019	Israel U18	2	(1)
2023–2025	Israel U21	4	(0)
- * Club domestic league appearances and goals as of 24 June 2026 ‡ National team caps and goals as of 23:19, 10 January 2022 (UTC)

Li-On Shimon Mizrahi (Hebrew: לי און מזרחי; born 24 October 2002) is an Israeli footballer who currently plays as a left-back for Beitar Jerusalem.

== Early life ==
Mizrahi was born and raised in Jerusalem, Israel, to an Israeli family of Mizrahi Jewish descent. His father is former Israeli footballer Eitan Mizrahi.

== Career statistics ==
=== Club ===
As of 1 June 2026.

Club	Season	League			State Cup		Toto Cup		Continental		Other		Total	
Club	Season	Division	Apps	Goals	Apps	Goals	Apps	Goals	Apps	Goals	Apps	Goals	Apps	Goals
Hapoel Tel Aviv	2021–22	Israeli Premier League	1	0	1	0	1	0	–		0	0	3	0
Hapoel Tel Aviv	Total		1	0	1	0	1	0	–		0	0	3	0
Beitar Jerusalem	2022–23	Israeli Premier League	16	0	4	0	4	0	–		0	0	24	0
Beitar Jerusalem	2023–24	Israeli Premier League	25	0	1	0	1	0	–		1	0	28	0
Beitar Jerusalem	2024–25	Israeli Premier League	18	1	4	0	4	0	–		0	0	26	1
Beitar Jerusalem	Total		59	1	9	0	9	0	–		1	0	78	1
Maccabi Netanya	2025–26	Israeli Premier League	17	0	2	0	0	0	–		0	0	19	0
Maccabi Netanya	Total		17	0	2	0	0	0	–		0	0	19	0
Hapoel Jerusalem	2026–27	Israeli Premier League	0	0	0	0	0	0	–		0	0	0	0
Hapoel Jerusalem	Total		0	0	0	0	0	0	–		0	0	0	0
Career total			77	1	12	0	10	0	0	0	1	0	100	1

== See also ==
- List of Jewish footballers
- List of Jews in sports
- List of Israelis
