= Eitan Mizrahi =

Israeli footballer

Eitan Mizrahi איתן מזרחי
Personal information
- Date of birth: 12 January 1972 (age 54)
- Place of birth: Jerusalem, Israel
- Height: 1.81 m (5 ft 11 1/2 in)
- Position: Defender

Youth career
- 1979–1989: Beitar Jerusalem

Senior career*
Years	Team	Apps	(Gls)
1989–2003	Beitar Jerusalem	299	(12)
2000	→Maccabi Herzliya	16	(1)
2003	Hakoah Ramat Gan		

International career
1992–1993	Israel U21	10	(0)
- * Club domestic league appearances and goals

Eitan Mizrahi (Hebrew: איתן מזרחי; born 22 January 1972) is an Israeli former footballer.

== Biography ==
Eitan Mizrahi was born in Jerusalem's East Talpiot neighborhood. He joined Beitar Jerusalem's children team when he was 7 years old. In 1993, his older brother was murdered in a terrorist attack in Armon Hanatziv.

His son is Li On Mizrahi, who also plays football.

== Sports career ==
He started his senior career with Beitar Jerusalem.

== Honours ==
Beitar Jerusalem

- Israel championship: 1992–93, 1996–97, 1997–98
