= Uri Malmilian =

Israeli footballer and manager

Uri Malmilian אורי מלמיליאן
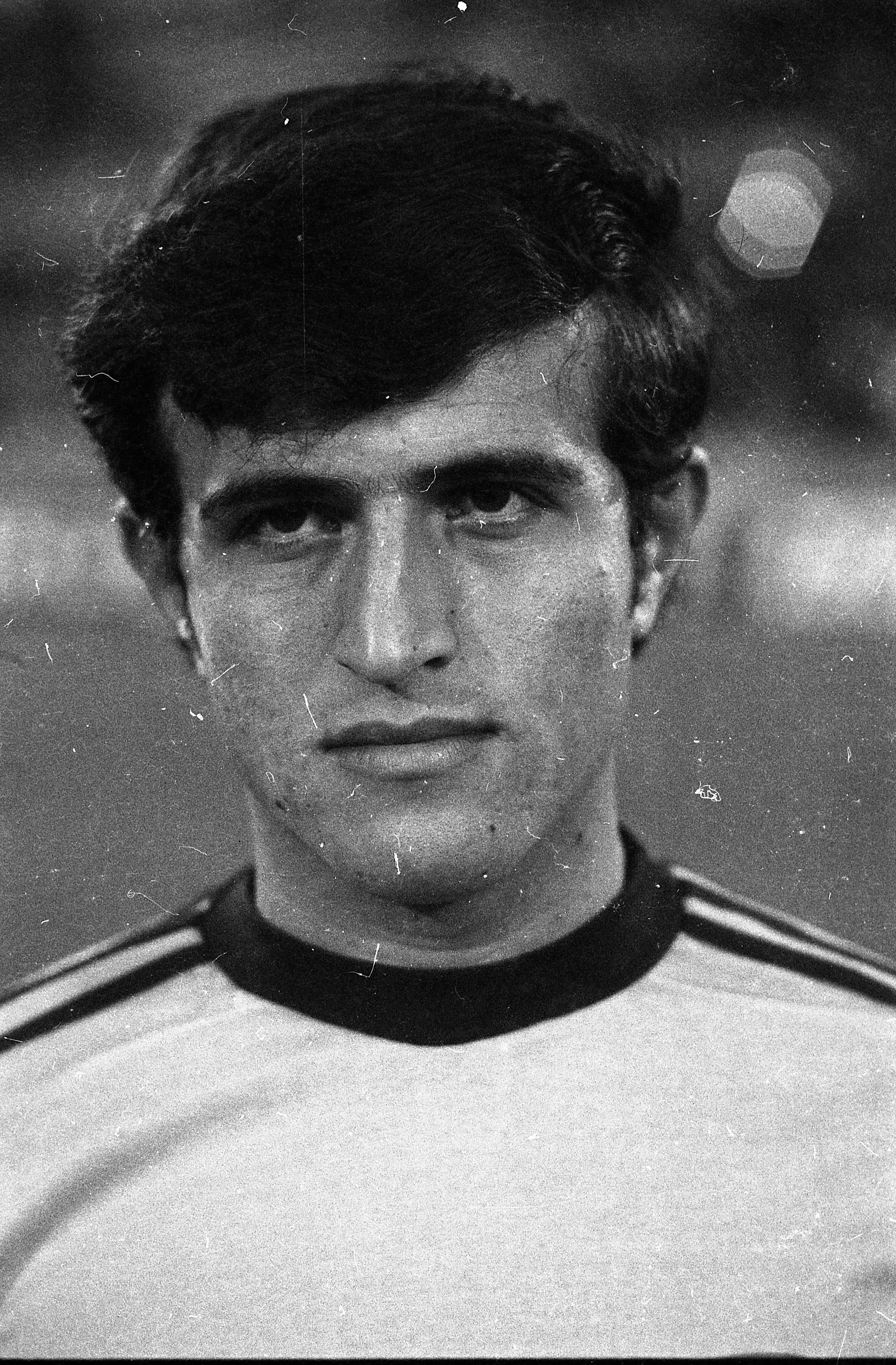

Personal information
- Date of birth: April 24, 1957 (age 69)
- Place of birth: Jerusalem
- Position: Midfielder

Senior career*
Years	Team	Apps	(Gls)
1973–1990	Beitar Jerusalem	465	(159)
1990–1992	Maccabi Tel Aviv	51	(23)
1992–1993	Hapoel Be'er Sheva	6	(1)
1993	Hapoel Kfar Saba	3	(0)

International career
1975–1990	Israel	62	(16)

Managerial career
- 1995–1996: Hapoel Jerusalem
- 1998–2002: Maccabi Netanya
- 2003–2007: Hakoah Ramat Gan
- 2007–2008: Hapoel Petah Tikva
- 2009–2010: Hapoel Ashkelon
- 2010–2011: Beitar Jerusalem
- * Club domestic league appearances and goals

Uri Malmilian (Hebrew: אורי מלמיליאן; born April 24, 1957) is an Israeli former football player and current manager.

== Early life and playing career ==
Born in the neighbourhood of Mamilla in West Jerusalem, Malmilian had a playing career in the Liga Leumit at Beitar Jerusalem. At an early age, he joined the youth system of Beitar. At the age of sixteen, Malmilian had his first appearance in the senior team of Beitar. In this first match he scored a stunning goal from a corner kick.

Malmilian had his big breakthrough in the 1976 season. He led the squad to the second place of the league and won Beitar's first important trophy, the Israeli Cup, after his goal in the 90th minute in the Final sealed the title. He was chosen as Player of the Season and was convoked to the National Team even before at the age of 18. This made Uri the youngest player ever to be convoked to Israel national football team.

In 1979 Malmilian received a lucrative offer from French club Paris Saint-Germain but he decided to keep playing with Beitar. In the next few years he formed a devastating trio with team-mates Danny Neuman and Victor Levy.

In 1986 Malmilian was the Top Scorer of the Israeli league with 14 goals in 30 matches, and in 1987, he coupled with Eli Ohana to bring the club its first championship. In 1989, he won another Israeli Cup and then surprisingly announced a move to rival club Maccabi Tel Aviv. With Maccabi, Malmilian won another championship in 1992. In 1993 Malmilian retired from active play.

== Managerial career ==
His managerial career started with Hapoel Jerusalem where he managed to promote them to the Israeli Premier League. He had success as the manager of Maccabi Netanya which he also promoted to the Israeli Premier League, but he quit after disputes with the club's management. Later, he managed Hakoah Ramat Gan which is yet another club that he managed to promote to the Israeli Premier League.

On 2007/8 season he was managing Hapoel Petah Tikva In Liga Leumit. He won the Toto Cup for that league, but was later fired. He managed Hapoel Ashkelon in the 2009–10 season of Liga Leumit and won again promotion to the Israeli Premier League. In 2010, he was signed to Beitar Jerusalem for the 2010/2011 season, he been manager until he resigned on January 17, 2011.

== Honors and awards ==
=== As a player ===
Club
Beitar Jerusalem

- Israel State Cup (5) : 1976, 1979, 1985, 1986, 1989
- Israeli championships: (1): 1986–87
- Israel Super Cup (2): 1976, 1986

Maccabi Tel Aviv

- Israeli championships: (1): 1991–92

=== Individual ===
- 2 times Top Scorer of the League
- 2 times Israeli player of the year

=== As a manager ===
- Israeli Second Division:
  - Winner (1): 1998–99
  - Runner-up (3): 1995–96, 2005–06, 2009–10
- Toto Cup (Leumit):
  - Winner (1): 2007
