= Yossi Mizrahi =

Israeli footballer and manager

Yossi Mizrahi יוסי מזרחי
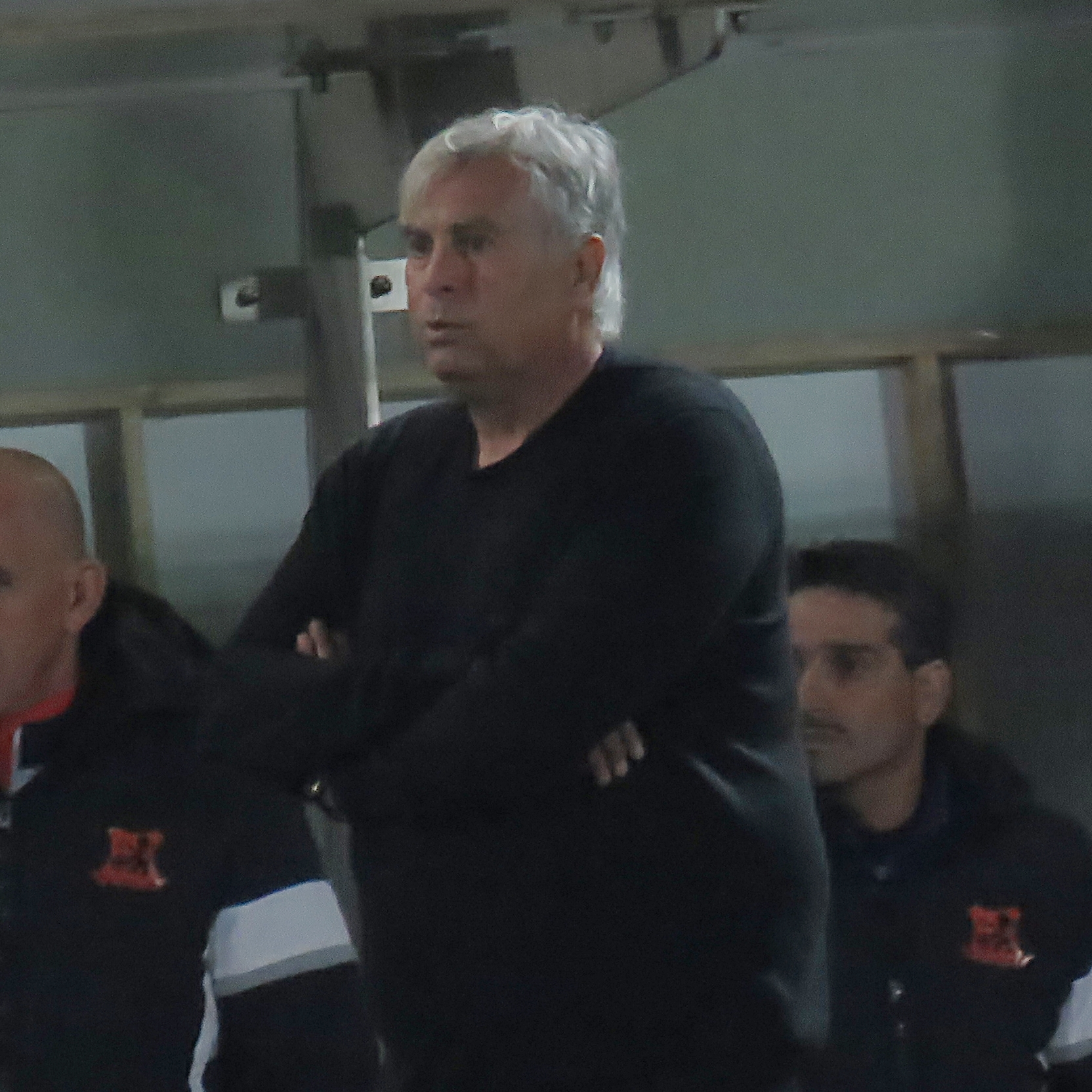

Personal information
- Full name: Yosef Mizrahi
- Date of birth: April 4, 1953 (age 73)
- Place of birth: Jerusalem, Israel
- Position: Goalkeeper

Team information
- Current team: Beitar Jerusalem

Youth career
- Hapoel Jerusalem

Senior career*
Years	Team	Apps	(Gls)
1974–1988	Beitar Jerusalem	371	(0)
1988–1989	Hapoel Lod		
1989–1990	Shimshon Tel Aviv		

International career
1979–1981	Israel	9	(0)

Managerial career
- 1994: Beitar Jerusalem (assistant manager)
- 1994–1995: Beitar Jerusalem
- 1995–1999: Hapoel Jerusalem
- 1999–2001: Maccabi Petah Tikva
- 2002: Beitar Jerusalem
- 2002–2004: Israel (assistant manager)
- 2004: F.C. Ashdod
- 2006–2007: Beitar Jerusalem
- 2007: Maccabi Petah Tikva
- 2007–2008: Apollon Limassol
- 2008–2010: F.C. Ashdod
- 2010–2011: Maccabi Tel Aviv
- 2011–2013: F.C. Ashdod
- 2013–2015: Maccabi Netanya
- 2016: Bnei Yehuda
- 2016: Hapoel Jerusalem
- 2016–2018: F.C. Ashdod (sports director)
- 2017: F.C. Ashdod (caretaker manager)
- 2018: F.C. Ashdod
- 2019: Hapoel Katamon
- 2021–2022: Beitar Jerusalem
- * Club domestic league appearances and goals

Yossi Mizrahi (Hebrew: יוסי מזרחי; born 1953) is a retired Israeli goalkeeper and is a current manager.

== Early life ==
Yosef (Yossi) Mizrahi was born in West Jerusalem on April 4, 1953. He grew up in Katamon and studied at Ma'aleh state religious school. As a teenager, he played on the youth team of Hapoel Jerusalem.

== Career ==
In 1974–1987, Mizrahi was the goalkeeper for Beitar Jerusalem. Two years after he joined the team, it won the State Cup for the first time. In 1994, Mizrahi was assistant coach under Amatzia Levkovic. In 1994, Levkovic was fired four games into the season and Mizrahi was appointed head coach. He later coached Hapoel Jerusalem, Maccabi Petah Tikva, F.C. Ashdod, Beitar Jerusalem FC, Apollon Limassol (Cyprus) and worked with Avram Grant as assistant coach in Israel's 2004 European Championship qualifying campaign.

Mizrahi is described as an "impeccable tactician, capable of turning wretched teams around and loved by his players."

Despite him winning the Championship with Beitar Jerusalem in the end of the season of 2006/07, Mizrahi was fired from the Club and signed with Apollon Limassol in Cyprus.

On April 21, 2008, Mizrahi left Apollon Limassol and returned to manage F.C. Ashdod. He resigned from F.C. Ashdod on May 20, 2010.

On June 10, 2010, Mizrahi signed with Maccabi Tel Aviv. He resigned from the team on January 4, 2011. He subsequently signed with F.C. Ashdod on April 18, 2011.
