= Beitar Jerusalem F.C. =

Association football club in Israel

Beitar Jerusalem
- Full name: Beitar Jerusalem Football Club
- Nicknames: Beitar; The Menorah; The Lions from the Capital; The Flag of the State
- Short name: BEI
- Founded: 1936; 90 years ago
- Ground: Teddy Stadium, Jerusalem, Israel
- Capacity: 31,733
- Owner: Barak Abramov
- Head coach: Almog Cohen
- League: Israeli Premier League
- 2025–26: Israeli Premier League, 2nd of 14
- Website: www.beitarfc.co.il
Home colours	Away colours	Third colours

Beitar Jerusalem Football Club (Hebrew: מועדון כדורגל בית״ר ירושלים, romanized: Moadon Kaduregel Beitar Yerushalayim), commonly known as Beitar Jerusalem (Hebrew: בית״ר ירושלים, romanized: Beitar Yerushalayim) or simply Beitar (בית״ר), is an Israeli professional football club based in the city of Jerusalem that plays in the Israeli Premier League, the top tier in Israeli football. The club has traditionally worn kit colours of yellow and black and plays its home matches in Teddy Stadium. The stadium is the largest stadium in Israel, with a capacity of 31,733.

The club is one of the most popular in Israel and is among the Israeli clubs with the highest number of fans in the country. The club was founded in 1936 by Shmuel Kirschstein and David Horn, who chaired the Betar branch in Jerusalem. Several team members were also part of the outlawed Irgun and Lehi militias closely associated with the right-wing Revisionist Zionism movement. Beitar's fans have become a highly controversial political symbol in Israeli football culture, unofficially aligning with the Revisionist Zionist movement and Likud party. Beitar is the only club in the Israel Premier League to have never signed an Arab player and the fanbase is notorious for its anti-Arab racism and anti-Muslim religious bigotry. Notably, the club has previously signed four non-Arab Muslim players.

Domestically, Beitar has won the Israeli Premier League six times, in 1986–87, 1992–93, 1996–97, 1997–98, 2006–07, and 2007–08; the Israeli Cup eight times, in 1975–76, 1978–79, 1984–85, 1985–86, 1988–89, 2007–08, 2008–09, 2022–23; and Israeli Supercups twice in 1976 and 1986.

== History ==
A chart showing the progress of Beitar Jerusalem through the Israeli football league system, from 1949–50 to the present

=== British Mandate ===
Beitar Jerusalem was founded in 1936 by Shmuel Kirschstein and David Horn as a youth team. The first games were held against Armenian and Arab teams in Jerusalem, though Hapoel Jerusalem boycotted for political reasons. In 1942, a match was held at Tel Aviv's Maccabiah Stadium between Beitar and the Islamic Sports Club of Haifa. Beitar won 5–1. At the end of 1943 and early 1944, Beitar played several games against the club from Katamon, Al-Dajani, the city's leading Arab team.

Jerusalem Cup Games of 1944

- 15 April 1944: Beitar Jerusalem 1–1 Plebis
- 22 April 1944: Beitar Jerusalem 2–2 Plebis
- 13 May 1944: Beitar Jerusalem 3–2 Plebis
- 20 May 1944: Beitar Jerusalem 1–3 Allwain

Later, Beitar Jerusalem qualified for the final, which was to be held against the team of the "Paymasters" of the British mandate. The fans of rival Hapoel Jerusalem disrupted the game, and the "Jerusalem Cup remained in the hands of the politicians in Tel Aviv."

On 19 October 1944, several club players were among 251 persons who were deported to Eritrea, Kenya, and Sudan by the British Mandate authorities. Among the deportees were David Horn and Rabinovich and some members of Beitar Jerusalem's "First team of 1936." A Beitar Jerusalem team was set up in Gilgil, where many deportees played in city-of-origin-based teams. A plan was made to dig a tunnel from the centre of a football pitch in the detention camp in Kenya. Two of the deportees were murdered by Sudanese guards for an alleged "escape attempt". Six succeeded in reaching Europe. All living deportees reached Israel in July 1948.

When a joint team of Beitar Jerusalem and Beitar Tel Aviv visited Lebanon and Syria, they played against Homenetmen, an Armenian team, which ended in 0–0, and the French Army team, in which Beitar lost 2–5. Both games were held in Beirut. Another game, planned in Aleppo, was cancelled because of a diplomatic incident as Arab delegates in the hotel protested seeing an "Eretz Yisrael" flag, now the Israeli flag, in an Arab country. The British ambassador intervened, suggesting that the Union Jack be raised instead of the "Eretz Yisrael" flag, but the head of delegation Hayyim Levin opposed. Due to the impasse, the game was canceled. Simon Alfasi, Shimon Stern, Yisrael Yehezqel, and goalkeeper Yosef Meyuhas were the Beitar Jerusalem players on the trip.

In 1946, Beitar Jerusalem qualified for the 2nd round of the Cup Games against Maccabi Tel Aviv. The scores were a 3–3 and a loss 3–2 in game 2. Simon Alfasi scored all five goals for the club, three in the first and two in the second.

On 8 August 1947, all Beitar clubs were banned by the British mandate authorities. The club name was changed to "Nordiah Jerusalem" before a local league was set up in the Jerusalem district in November 1947. On 15 November 1947, Beitar as "Nordiah Jerusalem" won the first derby, 3–1 over Hapoel Jerusalem, and on 29 November 1947, a second win was achieved, 8–1 over Degel Zion when one player Simon Alfasi scored six goals in a game, the record for any Beitar Jerusalem's player that stands until today. The club led the league on 29 November 1947, on the same evening when UN GA Resolution 181 was proclaimed, and on 30 November 1947, the games were stopped abruptly: on that day, the 1948 Arab–Israeli War broke out. During the war, Beitar Jerusalem player Asher Benjamin was killed by the British when he entered a British camp in Jerusalem.

=== State of Israel ===
After independence in 1948, Beitar, again by its original name, played since the 1949–50 season in a "Special League" of "Jerusalem's district", ending in 5th place while achieving a win of 8–0 over Hapoel Ramla on 17 December 1949, the highest league win of Beitar Jerusalem in any league the club has not played. In the 1951–52 season, the club integrated into Liga Bet southern part, then the second tier. In 1953–54 the club won the southern division of Liga Bet, and were promoted to the top league, which had just been renamed Liga Leumit. In their first season in the top flight, they finished 11th out of 14, and were forced to participate in promotion/relegation play-offs. Although they were the highest-placed club to take part in the play-offs, they finished at the bottom of the group, Beitar were relegated back to the second league, now renamed Liga Alef. In 1957–58 they won Liga Alef, but were not promoted, as there was no promotion or relegation that year.

They won Liga Alef again in 1966–68 (a two-year season) and were promoted back to Liga Leumit. That was the best league season ever for Beitar Jerusalem, although it was winning the 2nd division "only". 104 points out of a possible 120, for a season of 60 matches, when two points were given for winning a match. The club had 32 an undefeated streak with a sequence of 19 wins starting with the 42nd match to the 60th match inclusive, the record of Beitar Jerusalem in any league, scoring 161 league goals. 225,000 spectators saw the club's matches in that season. The prize that the club management gave to the players was a trip to the United States of America.

After finishing thirteenth in 1968–69, Beitar finished fifth in 1969–70, their best performance to date.

=== 1970s ===
In the 1971–72 Liga they finished as runners-up to Maccabi Tel Aviv. In 1974, during a match against Hapoel Petah Tikva, Beitar fans invaded the pitch and attacked Petah Tikva players and fans. This caused the first of several "radius" penalties, in which the club was forced to play matches in other cities behind closed doors. Beitar were also due to be relegated, but were saved by the intervention of Knesset members Ehud Olmert and Yossi Sarid, who forced the suspension of the relegation threat and called for an investigation of Israel Football Association corruption. In 1974–75 the club reached the State Cup final for the first time, but lost 3–1 to Hapoel Kfar Saba. In the same season they finished second bottom of the league, and were due to be relegated to Liga Alef. However, an IFA decision to expand the league from 16 to 18 clubs saw them reprieved.

The next season they finished runners-up in the league to Hapoel Be'er Sheva and reached the State Cup final again, this time beating Maccabi Tel Aviv 2–1 to claim their first piece of major silverware, on 16 June 1976, 55,000 or 60,000 spectators saw the game in an overcrowded Ramat Gan Stadium. Danny Noyman and Uri Malmilian scored for Beitar Jerusalem. (Note: The final was not televised, because the shirts of Maccabi Tel Aviv players bore a sponsor commercial. It was prohibited to show commercials on a state-run TV then, but the law about it was changed later to allow broadcasting advertisements.) On 11 September 1976, the club won the Israeli Super Cup for the first time after beating Hapoel Be'er Sheva 3–2. Uri Malmilian scored two goals, and David Yishai scored another goal for Beitar Jerusalem. The club finished as runners-up in 1977–78.

In 1978–79, the club ended as runners-up: they also reached the cup final, winning 2–1 against Maccabi Tel Aviv, on 6 June 1979. Danny Noyman and Yossi Avrahami scored for Beitar Jerusalem to win the State Cup for the 2nd time.

Despite the run of success towards the end of the 1970s, the club was dependent mainly on Uri Malmilian's ability. Early in the season, he suffered an awful injury, crippling him with the need for three operations until 1981, and missing most of the games until the summer of 1981. Beitar finished bottom of the division in 1979–80, and were relegated to Liga Artzit. However, they made an immediate return to the top division after finishing as runners-up to Beitar Tel Aviv in their first season back in the second tier.

=== 1980s ===
The 1981–82 started with a sports disaster for the club. On 12 September 1981, referee Avraham Klein gave a win to Maccabi Tel Aviv in a series of a wrong decisions: cancelling a goal of Beitar Jerusalem's player Yaron Adiv when he and Beitar's players celebrated the goal, then allowing seconds after Maccabi player Moti Ivanir to score a goal from an offside position. A crowd of 8,000 Beitar Jerusalem's fans went crazy. The Israeli Football Association quickly decided to punish Beitar Jerusalem and discussed the so-called "football game" for six weeks before stating to leave the outcome as 2–1 win to Maccabi Tel Aviv, and filing a reprimand about Avraham Klein. (Note: Avraham Klein was not a referee in Beitar's games ever again. On 27 May 1986, Israeli Football Association planned to give him an award when he retired on occasion of State Cup final, but 16,000 Beitar Jerusalem fans were there escorting the team, among them were the writer of those lines and his brother. Klein did not show up, knowing about the song of curses heard by Beitar's fans since 12 September 1981 against Avraham Klein, and fearing the Beitar fans' reaction. The prize of the Israeli Football Association was given to Klein privately. In 2000, 19 years after the troubled game, Yossi Mizrahi was asked about the game and said he forgave Klein. Also, Ivanir memorized his goal. Klein defended his decision to disallow Yaron Adiv's goal, but years later in his autobiography, he apologized for not stopping the game before Moti Ivanir's goal. There are among Beitar Jerusalem's long-time fans who claim until today that the troubled game was a set-up. Up to them: Avraham Klein is a Maccabi Tel Aviv fan, a good reason for him for setting the score in his favored team.) Also, the next game of Beitar Jerusalem is remembered: on 19 September 1981, a player of Hapoel Be'er Sheva, Shalom Avitan hit his teammate Eli Vaitzman on his face, and the Hapoel Be'er Sheva coach entered the pitch and took Shalom Avitan by his hand out of the pitch, preventing a red card by the referee. Beitar Jerusalem won 2–0. Later, with Eli Ohana in his first season, Beitar Jerusalem improved its standing, ending the season in 6th place, above Maccabi Tel Aviv, who, to the delight of Beitar fans, ended that season in 8th place.

The season of 1982–83 is remembered as the "Crazy Season". (Note: This descriptive title is taken from the book: "I Love You Beitar..." regarding this season) A bad start of two draws and two losses caused the firing of the coach Eliahu Ofer without stopping his salary payments, and he said "They will ask me to come back". After changing of seven Management members and five coaches, Eliahu Ofer was asked to come back and he came back to be a coach in mid-season, the club was in 16th and last place for two weeks but recovered: from the 18th game to 29th game inclusive, 12 no-lose sequence of games, Beitar ended the season in the 8th place. This is a place to explain that traditionally as a Beitar movement branch, the club was managed by Heruth and later Likud parties members. Party members were appointed by party apparatus to the party representative football club managers to give them managing training before venturing out into the political arena. This arrangement lasted until 1999. Some of the managers are ever remembered for good reasons who held Beitar well, such as Reuven Rivlin and his Brother Eliezer Rivlin, but Yossi Zharzhervski left the club after his well remembered brawl with Uri Malmilian when Zharzhevski told Malmilian in the midst of the troubles of 1982–83 season: "I will burn your legs". As a fan said, "Within 3 days Zharzhevski will not be in Beitar", and the fan was proved right. Uri Malmilian was referred by Beitar fans as a saint and was given full support. On the third day Zharzhevski resigned.

In 1983–84 Beitar went into the penultimate game of the season needing a win or draw (Note: The goals ratio was not clear: Earlier that season Maccbi Haifa Got A Technical win over Shimshon Tel Aviv after a referee was hit by a half eaten apple that was thrown from the crowd. Shimshon was to be blamed about it. So It is not remembered well if A draw of Beitar could even the standings of 1–2 places, or being 1st or 2nd.) to win the title. However, they lost 1–3 to Hapoel Tel Aviv, allowing Maccabi Haifa to win the league, despite Beitar winning the last game 3–2 against Shimshon Tel Aviv, Maccabi Haifa won 1–0 over Maccabi Ramat Amidar and became champions.

In 1984–85 Beitar finished again as runner-up, and won the State Cup for the third time, winning 1–0 over Maccabi Haifa on 4 June 1985. Eli Ohana scored, after which coach David Shveizer left.

In 1985–86, in the summer of 1985, Dror Kashtan took over as manager. Almost immediately the club won the Lilian Cup on 10 September 1985 for the first and only time, after winning all four of its games by combined scores of 14–2. Asher Sason scored six goals, at least one goal in each game. Beitar Jerusalem finished the league in the 4th place. They retained the cup in 1985–86, beating Shimshon Tel Aviv 2–1, on 27 May 1986. This was the 4th time that the club won the State Cup. Eli Ohana and Uri Malmilian scored for Beitar Jerusalem.

On 16 September 1986, Beitar Jerusalem won the Israeli Super Cup for the 2nd time, after winning 2–1 over Hapoel Tel Aviv. Eli Ohana and Uri Malmilian Scored for Beitar Jerusalem.

Despite having to play all home matches at Bloomfield Stadium in Tel Aviv, in 1986–87 Beitar claimed their first championship on 2 May 1987, winning the league by a 15-point margin. Both Uri Malmilian and Eli Ohana scored 15 league goals Each. Sammy Malka scored 13 league goals to make his best season of his career, Gary Van Der Mullen became the ace card and secured eight league points by scoring five league goals in about 17 games, most of them as a substitute. On 3 May 1987 a reporter of Maariv wrote: "I saw the disappointment-full crowds frenzied out of happiness, it is a thing that cannot be described in words." Dror Kashtan's "Coronation Speech" lasted only 36 seconds.

Kashtan left the club to manage Maccabi Haifa. Eliahu Ofer, after the absence of a few seasons, again became the coach. In 1987–88 Beitar Jerusalem ended in 9th place, and at the end of the league the club won the Israeli Mini Football championship for the first time on 24 May 1988 after beating Bnei Yehuda 5–3. That was the first and the last time ever that a nationwide mini football tournament was held in Israel; 24 teams took part. The tournament was held in Malha Stadium in a hall regularly used for Basketball games. Uri Malmilian acted as the owner of the place and was the tournament star. Eliahu Ofer finally won a title with Beitar Jerusalem.

Kashtan returned in 1988. In 1988–89 they won the State Cup again. Uri Malmilian scored seven goals on his way to winning the trophy. The club beat Maccabi Haifa 4–3 on penalties after a 3–3 draw on 14 June 1989. Uri Malmilian scored one goal, and Avi Cohen of Jerusalem scored two goals in the game and one goal in the penalties shootout, both in their last game before leaving Beitar Jerusalem. Moshe Ben Harush, Hannan Azulay and Ya'akov Schwartz were the other scorers of the penalties shootout, Beitar Jerusalem players did not miss. Two of Maccabi Haifa players missed. That was the 5th winning of the club in the State Cup Kashtan left the club again during 1989.

The 1989–90 was a survival struggle, it became a success by winning the last league game, 3–2 over Maccabi Netanya F.C. Each of three scorers scored their first and only goal in the whole season. Guram Adzhoyev, that Israeli media told that he is a Tadjik player who came from Russia, got sympathy among fans for his games despite scoring only one goal. That goal secured a good end to that season. The Bulgarian Atanas Pashev was the season star. Four league goals made him the top scorer of the club, one-fifth of the 20 league goals that Beitar Jerusalem players scored during that season, but he was attributed that his goals literally saved the club from being relegated.

=== 1990s ===
In 1990–91 they finished second bottom of Liga Leumit, and were relegated to Liga Artzit. Under Lufa Kadosh (23 April 1940 – 29 April 2014) the club made an immediate return to the top division. Eli Ohana returned from Europe as ever since regarded as a man who came to save his club. He scored 17 league goals in that season. The club won 1st place in a margin of nine league goals over Hapoel Haifa, both had 60 league points, and both were promoted.

Kashtan returned to the club, winning on 1 May 1993, the 2nd time championship in their first season back in Liga Leumit, the club won 22 league games out of 33 setting a winning record in the 1st division and 71 points, also a record during one 1st division league season for Beitar Jerusalem. Eli Ohana and Ronen Harazi where the championship stars. On 16 March 1993, in the State Cup games, the club set its all-time record in any tournament with a 9–0 win over Beitar Ramla.

The 1993–94 season ended when the score of the club was 75–66 (+9) but yielded almost nothing positive. Kashtan departed for a fourth time.

The coach Amazia Levkovitch came and the season of 1994–95 started bad, he was fired after four games, replaced by Yossi Mizrahi, the club started in the 16th and last place, reached to 1st place and ended in 8th place, meanwhile achieving a win of 8–1 over Maccabi Herzliya on 22 October 1994, the highest win ever of Beitar Jerusalem in the first league games.

In Liga Leumit 1995–96 with the appointment of Eli Cohen, the club improved to finish in 3rd place.

The club won the championship title for the 3rd time in 1996–97 on 17 May 1997. On its way the club gained eight straight wins and after that within the season nine wins in a row. This is a record in Beitar Jerusalem games in the 1st league games. Eli Ohana, Ronen Harazi and Itzik Zohar were the championship stars. As the season ended, Eli Cohen said: "Two years in Beitar are equal to five years elsewhere." His contract ended and he left.

In 1997–98, Beitar Jerusalem won the Toto Cup for the 1st time on 23 December 1997 by winning 3–1 over Maccabi Tel Aviv and later in that season won the 4th championship on 9 May 1998, by which time Kashtan had returned to the club again.

Despite Itzik Zohar leaving and Eli Ohana suffering an injury in the seventh game without playing until the end, Istvan Pisont led the club to win an achievement only preceded by Maccabi Haifa in 1994.

In 1998–99 Beitar reached the cup final, but lost 3–1 on penalties to Hapoel Tel Aviv after a 1–1 draw.

Director Moshe Dadash could not carry the club alone. The Involvement of Likud party diminished to that of Ehud Olmert alone. On 6 October 1999 Beitar was sold for the first time to Yaakov Ben Gur. Kashtan was replaced by former player Eli Ohana, under whom the club reached the cup final again the following season, where they lost on penalties to Hapoel Tel Aviv again. Yaakov Ben Gur left over a brawl with Eli Ohana and the team was sold to Gad Zeevi.

=== 2000s ===
At the end of the 1990s the club was in severe financial difficulties; chairman Moshe Dadash had sold the club's training grounds and pocketed the money. Gad Zeevi brought the money to buy ten new players in almost unlimited prices and salaries. At the end of the 1999–00 season, Ohana was fired and replaced by Eli Guttman. Guttman started the Ligat Ha'Al 2000–01 well, going the first 18 games without a loss, and won also the Shalom Cup (Roma) – Peace Cup. In Rome on 10 September 2000 the club beat Alwaqass from Jordan 7–0 in a game which lasted 45 minutes, Scoreres : Yaniv Abarjil 3, Alon Mizrahi 2, Beni Hadad 1, AlJaabir (OG) 1. Later in the same evening Beitar won 1–0 over Roma, scorer : Yaniv Abarjil. In another 45 minutes game, and won its first and only title out of Israel. (Note: The quartermaster of Beitar Meir Harush became famous in Greek media at that evening: Beitar Jerusalem whole team flew directly from Italy to Greece to play vs. PAOK in UEFA Cup tournament. Local media heard about Beitar's newly winning and when Meir Harush came out of the airplane, carrying the trophy he was immediately surrounded by photographers. It was told that somebody in Greece said that Beitar Jerusalem should be regarded as a serious team.) Days later Beitar lost 1–3 to PAOK in UEFA Cup tournament in Greece. The next game with PAOK ended in 3–3 draw. Moshe Dadash was forced to leave by Israel Football Association over his juristic problems exposed in 2001 concerning the training pitch in Bayit Vegan. The real trouble was exposed by an Israeli court in 2005. Later the season ended in a fiasco, both on the pitch and financially, Guttman became sick and left after 22 league games, and Nissim Bakhar the winner of two titles in 1976 returned, and brought quiet to the team until the season ended. In the later years Eli Guttman and players were accused by fans and media in cheating Gad Zeevi and capitalizing over his expense, concerning the real prices and salaries of some players, especially Branko Savić and Milan Stoyanoski. Gad Zeevi got into troubles with Israeli police over Bezeq shares, and found Beitar Jerusalem "Financially Unworthy" and left Beitar, applying to a court to declare Beitar's bankruptcy.

After the club's bankruptcy was declared by a court, 'Ami Fulman was appointed as an interim director by the court until club debts could be settled. 'Ami Fulman and his assistant got a salary of 1 million NIS together and the club was given a budget of 5 million NIS. The previous season players were convinced to get only 25% of their contracted salaries, those agreeing joining the Creditors Arrangement. The club started to search for players and new owner(s) and fans took active part in it, filling the courtroom in every discussion about the club, and some opened a bank account for donations. Its number was known to few (Note: The news about the bank account were known from the media but most of the fans knew the number after the account was closed and the money collected. The writer of these lines knew the number years later from the book "I love you Beitar".) only 54,000 NIS were collected. Beitar Jerusalem was not allowed to play the first three games; the games were postponed instead of forfeited by Beitar. The club started to play only from the 4th game onward, losing the 4th, 5th, 6th games, playing to a draw in the next three games and winning for the 1st time vs. Hapoel Rishon LeZion. Meanwhile, new buyers were approved by the court: Meir Panijel and brothers Meir Levi and Shaul Levi, aided by Sasson Shem Tov. The fans felt that they had done their best to help their team. Until the 29th league game, inclusive, out of 33, Beitar was in 12th and last place, with only five wins and ten draws, 25 points. The 30th game was won, and also the 31st game was won. The 32nd game was a draw 3–3 against Maccabi Kiryat Gat F.C. a rival in the bottom of the league. Beitar Jerusalem promoted jumped to 10th place. The last game was a draw 1–1 vs. the new champion Maccabi Haifa. Beitar ended the season with 7 league wins, 12 draws, 14 losses, 33 points, 39 goals for, 49 goals against, and kept the 10th place and avoided relegation. Manor Hassan scored 11 league goals in his only season as a club player. Beitar scored 15 goals in 3 State Cup games, including an away win 7–2 over F.C. Ashdod but lost 0–1 to Maccabi Haifa in the semi-final, on 7 May 2002.

The club ended the season of 2002–03 in the 9th place, and was certificated by Israel Football Association as the Honest Team of the Season, in the merit of 0 red cards and 71 yellow cards of club players, the least numbers in the whole of the Israeli leagues. The prize was a DVD recorder given to the club with the certificate about the achievement. (Note: When the writer of these lines bragged for that prize in a Beitar's fans internet forum he was answered by a question: "What are you proud of? The DVD?! The reason for ending in the 9th place without a red card and only 71 yellow cards is that Beitar's players did not fight...")

The news for the club ahead of 2003–2004 season, came from Maccabi Tel Aviv, the champion of 2002–03 season. On 13 August 2003, three senior club members declared in a press conference: Avi Nimni and Tal Banin were being ousted from the club, accused of dividing the team ("Making Camps of separate players"). Meir Panijel saw the opportunity to take Avi Nimni; the problem was his large contract. Meir Panijel offered 3 Million NIS. After months of negotiations, en elaborate deal was made. Nimni got 4,200,000 NIS for 2 1/2 seasons, part of it paid by Maccabi Tel Aviv. Nimni joined with Beitar Jerusalem in mid season, scoring eight league goals as Beitar ended the season in 9th place.

A Futsal team of Beitar Jerusalem led by former football goalkeeper Shlomi Maman won the 2004 championship. although a planned playoff never held, because of a financial crisis of the league. Beitar jerusalem was in 1st place then, and any mention of it was vanished from the Israeli media at once. Many years later it became clear the Beitar Jerusalem was declared as a champion.

Avi Nimni continued to play with the club during 2004–05 season, adding 12 more league goals, his charisma helping the team to 4th place. By the end of the season Avi Nimni aggregate score was 20 league goals in 50 league games.

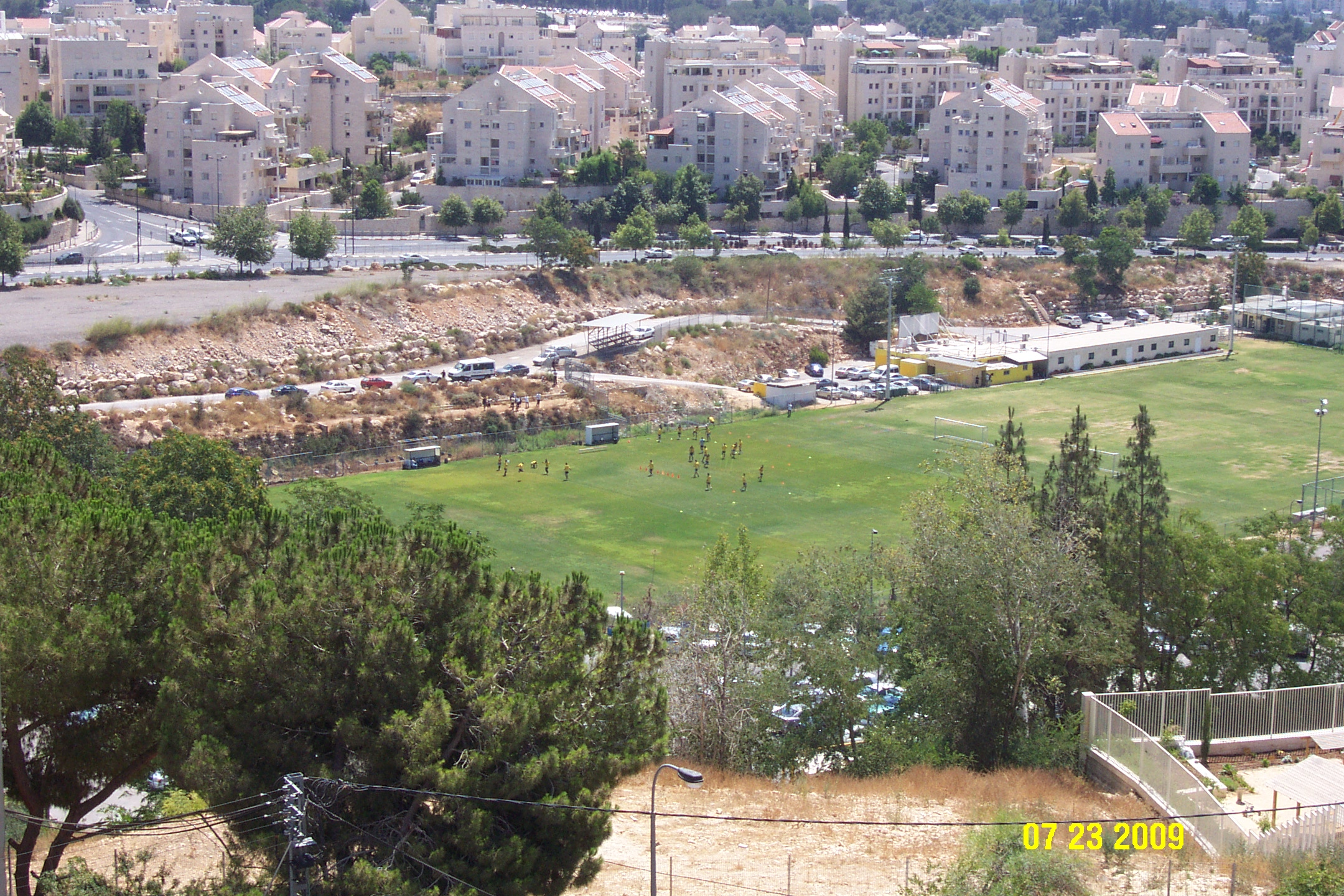
Beitar Jerusalem at their training grounds located between Beit Hakerem and Bayit Vegan

During the summer of 2005 it was proven that Meir Panijel had financial problems. The only worthy thing that remained out of his ownership of the club was the value of the training court in Bayit Vegan. After spending 60 million NIS in about four years he looked for his way out. The contract of Avi Nimni was a huge burden. Nimni was returned to Maccabi Tel Aviv by its fans that threw away all three persons that expelled him two years earlier. Panijel got relief for Beitar Jerusalem finances, and 1 year short of Nimni's contract termination with the club, both separated in good ways. The help to Beitar was unexpected after the 2005–2006 season started. On 18 August 2005, the club was bought by Russian-born billionaire Arcadi Gaydamak for 35,500,000 NIS without buying the training facility in Bayit Vegan. Meir Panijel continues to lease the training facility to the club for a yearly fee. Arcadi Gaydamak angered some Beitar fans when he donated $400,000 to Bnei Sakhnin in a diplomatic gesture. However, under Gaydamak, the club soon established itself as having the largest budget in Israeli football. Several new players were signed such as Jérôme Leroy, Fabrice Fernandes, David Aganzo and the club eventually signed manager Luis Fernández. Beitar finished 3rd in the league and qualified for the UEFA Cup in 2005–06.

Osvaldo Ardiles was appointed manager at the start of the 2006–07 season, but was sacked after disappointing results in the UEFA Cup. His replacement, Yossi Mizrahi, led the club to its 5th championship. On 7 May 2007, three games before the season's end, the club received the title offer via a TV news broadcast; (Note: The editor of these news knew it for about an hour earlier. When he got in the midst of a TV broadcast a phone call from his father: "Congratulations !" and was asked about the reason for the announcement in the news, he was answered shortly.) Maccabi Tel Aviv had been punished by with the removal of two league points due to a financial fraud involving the contracts of two of its players. This increased the margin of Beitar Jerusalem from 8 to 10 points with three games, worth nine points together, left to play. Afterwards there was a fan celebration ahead of the evening of game on 6 May 2007, a win against Hapoel Petah Tikva 2–0, because of a rumor that the championship was secured, which was false then. On 8 May 2007, the club player Milovan Mirošević told the press: "It is weird to win the championship without a game." Beitar Jerusalem did the best to win its next game over Hapoel Tel Aviv and won 2–1, to prove to be entitled for the championship on the pitch.

In the summer of 2007, Itzhak Shum came to be the club manager. In 2007–08 the club won its first championship and State Cup. Double, winning the championship title on 17 May 2008 by nine points and beating Hapoel Tel Aviv 5–4 on penalties in the cup final after a 0–0 draw, on 13 May 2008 for winning the State cup for the sixth time.

The following season, 2008–09 season started when Itzhak Shum as club manager, but bad start to the league and disqualification to UEFA Champions League, Shum was sacked without stopping his wages payments. Reuven Atar came to be the coach. In the last third of the season, Beitar went on a roll, eventually winning the State Cup for the 7th time, beating Maccabi Haifa 2–1 in the final on 26 May 2009. This was despite finishing the game with 10 players vs. 11; Cristian Alvarez and Aviram Baruchyan scored for the club.

In July 2009, Guma Aguiar invested over US$4 million and it was widely expected that he would take over ownership of the club, and indeed claimed to be so in December 2009. This was denied by the Israel Football Association, stating that Gaydamak remains the owner due to his ongoing legal issues complicating the sale of the club. Itzhak Shum returned to work as he was still under contract. On 26 January 2010, Beitar Jerusalem won the Toto Cup for the second time, beating Hapoel Ra'anana 1–0 on the strength of an Idan Vered goal. The trophy was given along with 1,300,000 NIS. At the beginning of the tournament Fans told Toto Tamuz: "Please win the cup called after your name" and he became the tournament star when he scored five goals out of the club total 15 goals. The club won seven games, one of them by a technical 3–0, one draw and one loss. Itzhak Shum told the media that he fulfilled his mission: Winning all three titles with Beitar Jerusalem, namely Championship, State Cup and Toto Cup, but he was unfortunate: Many fans claimed his football is "boring" and "sickening" and he had hard times from crowds without honour. He was fired before the season ended with the club ending the league in the 5th place. The club ended the season in financial profit, made by the Toto Cup money.

=== 2010s ===
Uri Malmilian started the 2010–11 season as a manager. In Toto Cup games the team started successfully. It passed the group stage without losing, ending in 1st place while setting its record score of any time in this tournament. On 9 November 2010 the club won 8–0 vs. F.C. Ashdod, qualified to the quarter-final. In the league games the club had hard times. Uri Malmilian asked to resign, but remained as a manager until after the 18th game. Beitar had only 19 points when he resigned, replaced by Ronny Levy. Beitar Jerusalem lost the Toto cup quarter-final to Maccabi Petah Tikva in penalties shootout. The club ended in 11th place.

In July 2011, Beitar Jerusalem announced that a deal was made between club owner Arcadi Gaydamak and American businessmen Dan Adler and Adam Levine who were to take over the club. However, the deal fell through when Adler and Levin heard about the club debts. Both Adler and Levine were referred by Beitar fans as "Two clowns who came to make an advertising trip on the expense of Beitar Jerusalem."

During June 2011, David Amsalem was appointed as a coach, but a few days before the league start in August he suddenly resigned a day after the team won 1–0 in a Toto Cup game. Amsalem explained that the team was not prepared for the season, and without new players he could not be responsible to the future. Yuval Naim replaced him. An unsuccessful start caused an end to his job when the club was close to the league's bottom. Eli Cohen, the winner of 1997 championship, became club manager. He won the title "Coach of the season" because of a sequence of 8 Beitar Jerusalem's league wins during his period. Beitar finished the season in 9th place.

On 17 June 2012, Gaydamak announced his decision to give up the ownership of Beitar Jerusalem, via a letter to the media, in which he specified the titles won by the club in his period, and the total sum of money that he invested in the club, by then: 378,886,000 NIS.

On 20 June 2013, the team was bought by Eli Tabib. The deal was confirmed on 2 July 2013. Eli Tabib took the responsibility to pay Beitar Jerusalem FC debts, totaling 12.5 Million NIS. The media reported that he paid most of them during August 2013.

After 6 years in office, Tabib removed Itzik Korenfein from the position of Club chairman.

Before the beginning of 2013/14 season, Eli Cohen II was appointed as Head Coach until December 2013. Ronny Levy replaced Cohen, but the club failed to improve in its achievements.

In April 2014, Menachem Koretski become the new coach until January 2015. Koretski was replaced by Guy Levy who led the club into the fourth place in the Championship table standings. For the first time since 2007, Beitar returned to European tournaments to compete in the European League. In June 2015 Slobodan Drapić became the new coach.

During the Europa League second qualifying round first leg at Sporting Charleroi, the game between Beitar and FC Charleroi was delayed for three minutes due to the unruly behavior of some Israeli supporters. The club suffered a heavy loss in Charleroi (5–1) and the owner Eli Tabib announced he would leave the club.

At the end of 2015–16 season, Beitar finished in the 3rd place in IPL and qualified for the Europa League first qualifying round. Slobodan Drapić left the club due to his contract ended and Ran Ben Shimon was appointed as the new manager. Beitar signed new players as: Idan Vered, Marcel Heister and Erik Sabo.

At the end of 2017–18 season, Beitar finished in the 3rd place in IPL and reach the Israeli cup final, but lost the title to Hapoel Haifa. Beitar Jerusalem scored at least one goal in each and every one of 36 league games in 2017–18 season, continuing scoring since the last 6 league games in 2016–17 season since 22 April 2017 making a record of 42 consecutive league games that Beitar Jerusalem scored, before adding the 1st league game in the next season, by scoring in it, making a record of 43 consecutive league games that Beitar Jerusalem scored, the historical record for the Israeli football ever. Beitar scored 75 league goals in 2017–18 season, even its record score in 1993–94 season.

On 13 May 2018, the club announced that it was changing its official name to Beitar Trump Jerusalem Football Club, saying that U.S. President Donald Trump had "displayed courage, vision and true love for the people of Israel and their capital."

On Monday, 13 August 2018, Beitar Jerusalem was sold to Moshe Hogeg, a high-tech entrepreneur, for 26.5 million NIS, which was 18 million NIS to Eli Tabib and 8.5 million NIS for debts payments and avoiding lawsuits. During that week Israeli defender Tal Ben Haim joined with the club. After buying the team, Hogeg said that he hoped to put it on a "new path" and that religion would no longer be a factor in the club's personnel decisions.

=== 2020s ===
On 7 December 2020, Sheikh Hamad bin Khalifa Al Nahyan, a member of Abu Dhabi's ruling family, announced plans to acquire a 50 percent stake in the club. The deal was brokered by Jewish-Emirati businessman Naum Koen, chairman of the NY Koen Group. Al Nahyan's son, Mohamed bin Hamad bin Khalifa, was to sit on the team's board of directors. As part of the deal, Sheikh Khalifa al-Nahyan was to invest roughly $92 million into the club over the next ten years and his son would join the club's board of directors. Co-owner Moshe Hogeg said the new arrangement was an attempt to recast the club's image. "Our message is that we are all equal. We want to show to young kids that we are all equal and that we can work and do beautiful things together." However, the deal did not proceed, and collapsed in 2022 following claims of financial misconduct and Hogeg being accused of sex crimes.

=== 2020–2021 ===
Beitar Ended the league games in the 10th place. Moshe Hogeg had a "war in court" against 4 members of La Familia which made his life hard : Cursed his daughter and Told him : "We know in which school your son learns".

=== 2021–2022 ===
During September 2021 Moshe Hogeg decided to sell Beitar Jerusalem after investing 120 million NIS, a thing that he repeated to mention. In November 2021 he announced that he quits putting money in beitar jerusalem as of January 2022, and appointed lawyer Yitzhaq Younger as the man in charge as a trustee. Moshe Hogeg was arrested and later released by Israeli Police during that season. Economic troubles started, along with football hardships that where harming Beitar Jerusalem from the start of that season. The team management was searching for money to pay salaries. Some players were released in mid season. All other players and workers, had to agree that their salaries will be reduced by 30% but an agreement was made that the 30% are a "loan" from the players to the club. An improved playoff in the end of the season with no losses, gained the 10th place, on the last game on May 14, 2022. After that, the troubles of Beitar Jerusalem where intensified. Eli Ohana left his chairman role on May 31, on the end of his contract, maybe because of 2 reasons : unsuccessful relationships with Moshe Hogeg during that season, and knowing that there was no money for continuing his job. Israeli police regarded every Moshe Hogeg's properties as places of "concealing money", including Beitar Jerusalem. During July 2022, Israeli Police got earlier a permission by a court, to confiscate all Moshe Hogeg properties. Beitar Jerusalem became a hostage by law. Until August 10, there was a constant threat to relegate Beitar Jerusalem to "A league" because of debts of 42 Million NIS, by a regulation that a club that can not pay its contracts should not play in a professional league. Israeli Police demanded money from Moshe hogeg, and the intended buyer, Baraq Avramov, withdrew from negotiations by 9 August by Noon. On that afternoon by 18:00 Moshe Hogeg addressed the media urging Baraq Avramov to save Beitar Jerusalem, blaming all about no help, and asking "Is Beitar Jerusalem a property of the Police ?". in 9 August, 23:44 A Facebook page of Betar fans reported : Baraq Avramov is back in negotiations. A Likud Knesset member, Nir Barkat, A former Jerusalem's Mayor, found a donator to Beitar Jerusalem which donated 2 Million NIS. The threat of relegation was removed on August 10, 2022, when in elaborate deal was made between Moshe Hogeg and Baraq Avramov, and Beitar Jerusalem was sold to Baraq Avramov, which was forced to pay 5 Million NIS to Israeli Police, also in order to prevent money from Moshe Hogeg. This happened in August 10, After all was approved, on August 11, 2022, about 16:00 PM, Beitar Jerusalem was allowed to start 2022–2023 season in the IPL.

=== 2022–2023 ===
After negotiations, on 17 August 2022, Beitar Jerusalem sold its NFT rights for 6 years to Chroma-Way for 700000 Euros.

Beitar had a hard league season with 13 wins 4 draws and 16 losses, ended in 8th place, and had 3 seasons records : 2 positives, the highest win and the highest score of IPL IN 2022–2023 season, 6:3 over Maccabi Netania, when top scorer Ion Nicolaescu scored 4 goals, highest scorer in IPL during 2022–2023, and one record was negative, conceiving 58 league goals, equal to that of Maccabi Netania. Some days before the State Cup Final Baraq Avramov was selected as the Team Owner of The Season 2022–2023, by the Israeli Football Association.

Beitar surprised itself and its fans by winning the Israeli State Cup for the 8th time on 23 May 2023 after win 3:0 over Maccabi Netania, when Ion Nicolaescu (37) Fred Friday (76) And Yarden Shuah (90) Scored the goals, and Yarden Shuah was Involved in all goals. The Cup was awarded to Beitar on 24 May 2023 in President's House in Jerusalem, because a breakup of La Familia fans caused an evacuation of Israeli president by security forces.

=== 2023–2024 ===
Beitar had a hard season in every tournament it participated. A loss in Israeli Super Cup deprived Beitar of any chance of winning Toto Cup also, Beitar ended in 6th place. A draw 0:0 and a loss 1:4 to PAOK FC where the only games in a European tournament after many years of absence. The state cup became a past issue only after a loss in the 1st game. In the league Beitar started with -4 points after a penalty deprivation by Israeli Football Association, a punishment following the events right after the end of 2022-2023 State Cup Final. Beitar was at the bottom of the table most of the season, with more losses than wins, and a penalty deprivation of one more point, but ended with a positive goals ratio. Beitar ended in the 11th place in the league table. The only achievement was a win of 5:1 vs Hapoel Tel Aviv in Bloomfield Stadium, on 27 April 2024, the highest ever away win of Beitar against Hapoel Tel Aviv in Bloomfield stadium in the league.

=== 2024–2025 ===
The league season began well. Beitar reached briefly to the 1st place not holding it more than after a game twice, but the second half was weaker, especially the playoff. On 3 January 2025 Omer Atzili rejoined to Beitar Jerusalem. Beitar ended in the 4th place. Beitar reached to the state cup final, but lost 0–2 in a dreadful appearance.

=== 2025–2026 ===
Beitar started the UEFA Conference League Games vs. FK Sutjeska Nikšić with 2 wins: 5–2, and 2–1. Next rival was Skonto Riga. The 1st game ended by Skonto's win 3–0, In the next game, Beitar won 3–1, and did not qualified. All 4 games were held in Europe. As an outcome of time table with Conference League and Toto Cup games, Beitar started Toto cup tournament as one of the "European" teams, bypassing a need for a group stage. On 19 July 2025 Beitar won 2-0 vs. Maccabi Haifa in Sami Ofer Stadium, scorers: Omer Atzili, Silva Kani, and qualified to a semi final. On 18 August 2025 Beitar won 5–0, vs. Hapoel Haifa, scorers: Johnbosco Kalu, Omer Atzili, Yarin Levi, Dor Hugi, Ziv Ben Shimol. On 28 October 2025, Beitar Won the 2025-2026 Toto Cup after Winning 2:1 vs. Hapoel Tel Aviv, Scoreres for Beitar: Dor Micha, Johnbosco Kalu. Beitar ended the game with 10 players on the pitch: After 3 substitutions in 3 times, and when Luka Gadrani was injured in Overtime, Beitar could not send a substitute. Beitar won Toto Cup for the 4th time, by 3 wins in 3 games, aggregate score: 9–1. The final was held in Sami Ofer stadium in attendance of 24560 spectators. After winning the team travelled to the wedding of Ilai Hajjaj, A player of Beitar which did not participate in the final game. In the league games, as of 9 November 2025, After winning 6:2 against Maccabi Tel Aviv FC in Bloomfield Stadium, Beitar held 10 games: 6 wins, 2 draws, 2 losses, 20 points, and 3rd place in the IPL table. The season ended when beitar is in the second place, with 22 wins 10 draws, 4 losses, with 76 points, a record for Beitar in the 1st league, and beitar scored 78 goals in 36 league games, also a record for Beitar Jerusalem.

== Crest and colours ==
=== Crest ===
Former crest of Beitar Jerusalem, including the old version of the Menorah and the two lions that symbolized the Tribe of Judah.

The Menorah is the emblem of Israel and the logo of the early Revisionist Zionist movement Betar.

=== Shirt sponsors and manufacturers ===
Period	Kit Manufacturer	Shirt Sponsor
1997–2000	Diadora	Cellcom
2000–01	Diadora	Subaru
2001–02	Lotto	Eldan
2002–03	Lotto	Fresh&Go
2003–04	Diadora	Hot
2004–05	Kappa	Hot
2005–06	Kappa	014
2006–07	Adidas	014
2007–08	Adidas	B.Yair
2008–11	Adidas	Eldan
2011–13	Diadora	Eldan
2013–14	Diadora	Eldad Perry Group
2014–15	Puma	iTrader
2015–16	Puma	Yahalomit Peretz
2016–18	Givova	
2018–19	Givova	AppliCheck
2019–20	Umbro	Millenium Team
2020–present	Umbro	Geshem

== Rivalries ==
=== Rivalry with Hapoel Tel Aviv ===
Another rivalry with Hapoel Tel Aviv which is a political rivalry, as Hapoel Tel Aviv supporters tend to be socialist, a stark contrast to the more right-wing Beitar supporters.

=== Rivalry with Bnei Sakhnin ===
The rivalry with Bnei Sakhnin is too, a political rivalry as well as an ethnic and racial rivalry as Bnei Sakhnin are the most successful predominantly Arab club while Beitar Jerusalem remains the only major club to have never signed a Muslim Arab player in Israel.

== Grounds ==
=== Stadiums ===
==== Former Stadiums ====
Beitar held its first games as a professional football team in the "Dajani field", which was located in the old Katamon neighborhood. After the War of Independence and the establishment of the State of Israel, the team's home was officially moved to the YMCA Stadium, which has since become the team's regular home ground, until 1991, when the team moved to Teddy Stadium.

==== Teddy Stadium ====
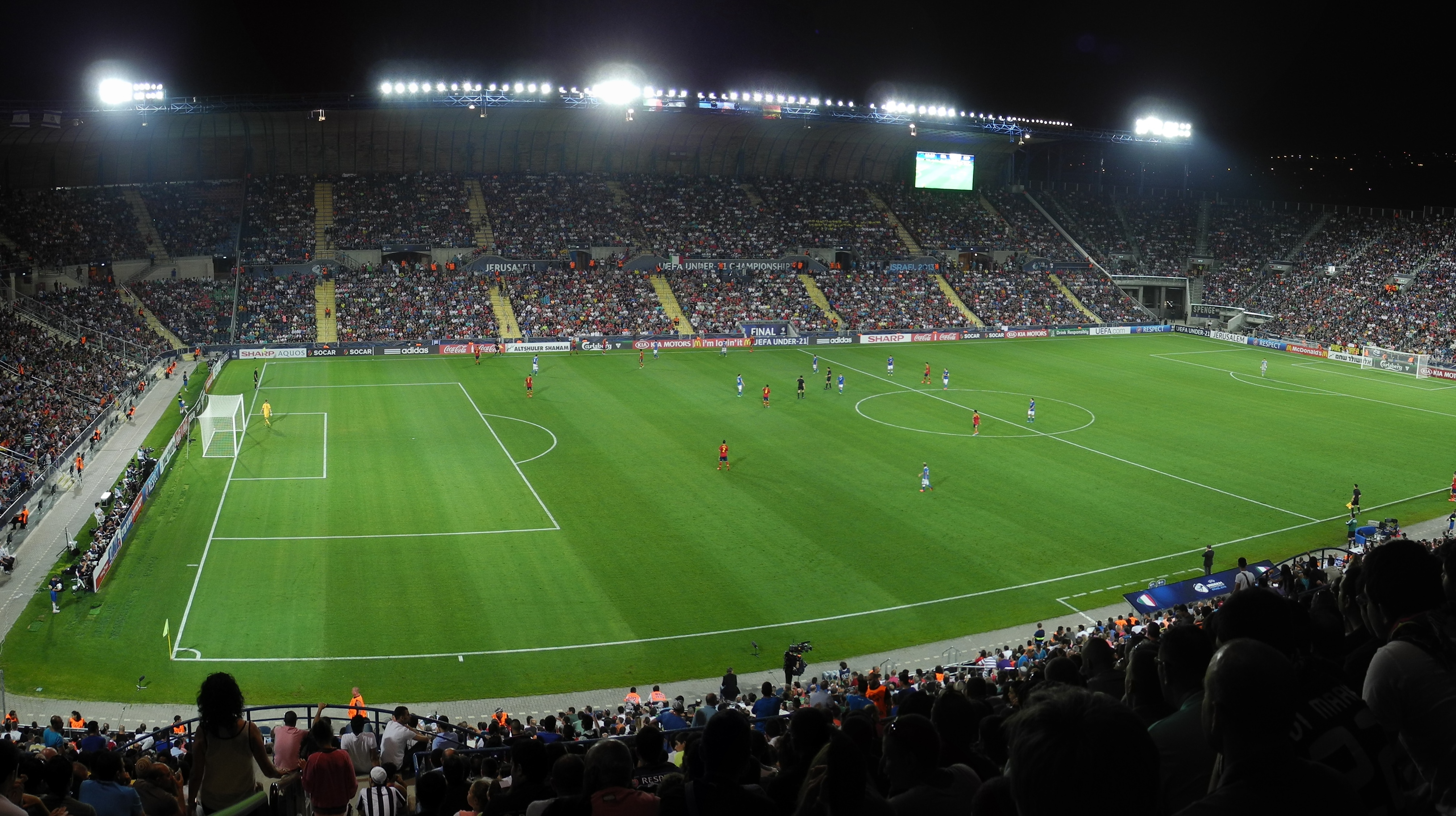
Teddy Stadium, Beitar's home ground.

In 1991, Beitar has moved to the Teddy Stadium, named after longtime Jerusalem mayor Teddy Kollek. Initially the stadium was two-sided and held 12,000 spectators. This was increased to 21,600 when a third side was completed in 1997. The fourth side of the stadium was completed in the summer of 2013 in anticipation of the UEFA under 21 championship hosted by Israel, increasing the capacity of the stadium to 31,733 seats.

The ground has been dubbed Gehinom (lit. Hell) by club supporters, for the hostile atmosphere it presents to visiting teams and their fans.

=== Training Ground ===
All of the departments of Beitar Jerusalem train in the training complex at Beit Vagan. The complex includes locker rooms for the alumni group and the youth department, gyms, physiotherapy rooms, dining room, cloakrooms and treatment rooms. The complex contains three training fields, two of them with synthetic grass. Each of the fields has two Tribunes on both sides, and all contain a total of about 750 seats.

The club's offices have been in the complex since 2009, and there is a fan shop inside the complex that sells cheerleading and merchandise products for the group's fans.

== Supporters and politics ==
The most vocal supporters of Beitar Jerusalem make up the controversial nationalist La Familia group. These fans are well-known for their opposition to integrating Arabs into the club and are proud of the fact that Beitar Jerusalem is the only team in the IPL that has never had an Arab player, although it has had several non-Arab players of the Islamic faith. Fans in and out of the stadium's stands chant anti-Arab and racist slogans — such as "Death to Arabs". The club has also been penalized many times for the behavior of its fans.

Although Beitar Jerusalem is yet to have an Arab player, team leaders say that they would welcome an Arab player when the right conditions make it possible.

Guram Adzhoyev, a Tajik, was the first Muslim to ever play for Beitar Jerusalem. During the hardship 1989–90 season, his religion went unnoticed by most fans. Adzhoyev was well-liked by Beitar fans due to his all-out efforts during 13 games of the season's second half. Adzhoyev's single goal in the last game, a 3–2 Beitar win over Maccabi Netanya, helped the club secure a berth the following season in Liga Leumit, the top league in Israel at the time.

Viktor Paço, an Albanian player, was a star for Beitar Jerusalem. He scored 21 league goals in 67 games and at least 2 State Cup goals during 2 non-consecutive seasons: 1999–00 and 2001–02. In an interview to the Jerusalem newspaper "Kol Ha'Ir", he stated that he is a Muslim, a fact that was later mentioned in the Israeli media.

Nigerian player Ndala Ibrahim, a Muslim, was on the team briefly in 2005 on loan from Maccabi Tel Aviv, played 4 games, supported by coach Eli Ohana, but left after being abused by Beitar fans. He returned to Maccabi Tel Aviv and soon returned to Nigeria.

In 2013, the club signed two Chechen Muslim players, Zaur Sadayev and Dzhabrail Kadiyev. When fans protested, Israeli Deputy Prime Minister Moshe Yaalon condemned the protest as shocking and racist, stating "I was shocked by the racism displayed in the Beitar Jerusalem stands yesterday against having Muslim or Arab players on the team". Fans of the club reportedly displayed a banner bearing the words "Beitar – forever pure" and chanted anti-Arab slogans at a match the day the players were signed, leading to four arrests. On 8 February 2013, 2 fans, Matan Navon and Evyatar Yosef, set fire to the club's administrative offices, apparently in response to the signing of Sadayev and Kadiyev. Prime Minister Benjamin Netanyahu, who is a Beitar supporter (along with many other senior Likud politicians), condemned the arson as "shameful" and "racist". On 3 March, Sadayev scored his first goal for Beitar during a league game against Maccabi Netanya, prompting hundreds of the team's fans to leave the stadium. Forever Pure, a documentary about the uproar surrounding the Chechen athletes, has been shown internationally and won the 2018 Emmy Award for Outstanding Politics & Government Documentary.

In 2019, Beitar fans association La Familia demanded that Ali Mohamed, a Christian from Niger who had signed for the club, change his name as Mohamed sounded "too Muslim", leading the club's owner Moshe Hogeg to threaten to sue the fans.

On 3 February 2025, during a match against Maccabi Tel Aviv, Beitar Jerusalem players wore orange jerseys to highlight the captivity of Shiri Bibas and her sons, Ariel and Kfir, in Gaza. The color orange became a symbol of their captivity due to the Bibas boys’ ginger hair.

== Honours ==
=== League ===
Honour	No.	Years
Israeli Championships	6	1986–87, 1992–93, 1996–97, 1997–98, 2006–07, 2007–08
Runners-up	7	1971–72, 1975–76, 1977–78, 1978–79, 1983–84, 1984–85, 2025-26

=== Cup competitions ===
Honour	No.	Years
State Cup	8	1975–76, 1978–79, 1984–85, 1985–86, 1988–89, 2007–08, 2008–09, 2022–23
Runners-up	5	1974–75, 1998–99, 1999–2000, 2017–18 2024–25
Toto Cup (top division)	4	1997–98, 2009–10 2019–20 2025–26
Super Cup	2	1976, 1986
Lilian Cup	1	1985–86
Shalom Cup (Roma) – Peace Cup	1	2000–01

=== Mini Football / Futsal ===
Honour	No.	Years
Mini Football / Futsal	2	1988, 2004

== Beitar Jerusalem in Europe ==
Beitar Jerusalem participated in Intertoto games in the middle of 1976 : 2 wins, 2 draws, 2 losses. The winner of the preliminary group stage was BSC Young Boys, and also in 1984, 1985, 1987, 1988, 1993, 1995, 2005. Beitar's first competitive European match which was not a part of Intertoto games, was a 1–1 draw with FC Zimbru Chişinău in the 1993-94 UEFA Champions League. The team has participated in the UEFA Champions League five times, never advancing farther than the second qualifying round.

=== UEFA ranking ===
- Bold row-separators indicate change of ranking system.
- Italic font indicate ongoing season.

Season	Rank	T. points	S. points	Ref.
2025–26	271 ▼	3.000	1.500	
2024–25	245 ▼	2.500		
2023–24	233 ▲	2.500	1.500	
2022–23	266 ▼	2.000		
2021–22	260 ▼	2.500		
2020–21	250 ▲	4.000	1.000	
2019–20	262 ▲	3.500		
2018–19	282 ▼	3.500	1.000	
2017–18	206 ▲	2.500	0.500	
2016–17	231 ▲	5.875	1.500	
2015–16	294 ▲	4.225	0.500	

=== Results ===
Season	Competition	Round	Club	Home	Away	Aggregate
1993–94	UEFA Champions League	Preliminary Round	(Moldova) Zimbru Chişinău	2–0	1–1	3–1
1993–94	UEFA Champions League	First Round	(Poland) Lech Poznań	2–4	0–3	2–7
1995	UEFA Intertoto Cup	Group stage	(Belgium) Charleroi	0–1	—N/a	5th
1995	UEFA Intertoto Cup	Group stage	(Turkey) Bursaspor	—N/a	0–2	5th
1995	UEFA Intertoto Cup	Group stage	(Slovakia) Košice	3–5	—N/a	5th
1995	UEFA Intertoto Cup	Group stage	(England) Wimbledon	—N/a	0–0	5th
1996–97	UEFA Cup	Preliminary Round	(Malta) Floriana	3–1	5–1	8–2
1996–97	UEFA Cup	Qualifying Round	(Norway) Bodø/Glimt	1–5	1–2	2–7
1997–98	UEFA Champions League	First Qualifying Round	(North Macedonia) Sileks	3–0	0–1	3–1
1997–98	UEFA Champions League	Second Qualifying Round	(Portugal) Sporting CP	0–0	0–3	0–3
1997–98	UEFA Cup	First Round	(Belgium) Club Brugge	2–1	0–3	2–4
1998–99	UEFA Champions League	First Qualifying Round	(Faroe Islands) B36 Tórshavn	4–1	1–0	5–1
1998–99	UEFA Champions League	Second Qualifying Round	(Portugal) Benfica	4–2	0–6	4–8
1998–99	UEFA Cup	First Round	(Scotland) Rangers	1–1	2–4	3–5
2000–01	UEFA Cup	Qualifying Round	(Georgia (country)) WIT Georgia	1–1	3–0	4–1
2000–01	UEFA Cup	First Round	(Greece) PAOK	3–3	1–3	4–6
2005	UEFA Intertoto Cup	First Round	(North Macedonia) Sileks	4–3	2–1	6–4
2005	UEFA Intertoto Cup	Second Round	(Czech Republic) Slovan Liberec	1–2	1–5	2–7
2006–07	UEFA Cup	Second Qualifying Round	(Romania) Dinamo Bucuresti	1–1	0–1	1–2
2007–08	UEFA Champions League	Second Qualifying Round	(Denmark) Copenhagen	1–1 ^{(a.e.t.)}	0–1	1–2
2008–09	UEFA Champions League	Second Qualifying Round	(Poland) Wisła Kraków	2–1	0–5	2–6
2015–16	UEFA Europa League	First Qualifying Round	(Kazakhstan) Ordabasy	2–1	0–0	2–1
2015–16	UEFA Europa League	Second Qualifying Round	(Belgium) Charleroi	1–4	1–5	2–9
2016–17	UEFA Europa League	First Qualifying Round	(Bosnia and Herzegovina) Sloboda Tuzla	1–0	0–0	1–0
2016–17	UEFA Europa League	Second Qualifying Round	(Cyprus) Omonia	1–0	2–3	3–3 (a)
2016–17	UEFA Europa League	Third Qualifying Round	(Latvia) Jelgava	3–0	1–1	4–1
2016–17	UEFA Europa League	Playoff Round	(France) Saint-Étienne	1–2	0–0	1–2
2017–18	UEFA Europa League	First Qualifying Round	(Hungary) Vasas	4–3	3–0	7–3
2017–18	UEFA Europa League	Second Qualifying Round	(Bulgaria) Botev Plovdiv	1–1	0–4	1–5
2018–19	UEFA Europa League	First Qualifying Round	(Georgia (country)) Chikhura Sachkhere	1–2	0–0	1–2
2020–21	UEFA Europa League	First Qualifying Round	(Albania) Teuta	—N/a	0–2	0–2
2023–24	UEFA Europa Conference League	Second Qualifying Round	(Greece) PAOK	1–4	0–0	1–4
2025–26	UEFA Conference League	Second Qualifying Round	(Montenegro) Sutjeska Nikšić	5–2	2–1	7–3
2025–26	UEFA Conference League	Third Qualifying Round	(Latvia) Riga	3–1	0–3	3–4
2026–27	UEFA Conference League	Second Qualifying Round	(Cyprus) AEK Larnaca	2–3^{(a.e.t.)}	1–0	3–3^{(4–3 p)}
2026–27	UEFA Conference League	Third Qualifying Round	Austria Wien	1–2	2–1 ^{(a.e.t.)}	3–3^{(2–4 p)}

== Records ==
=== Club own records ===
- Seasons in the Israeli 1St League: 57 (Including 2025–2026)
- Lowest season position: 10 in the second league (League A)
- Record win: 9:0 (against Beitar Ramla F.C. 1992–93, State Cup)
- Record Highest Outcome in any game: 10 Goals, A premier league win 8:2 (against Maccabi Netanya, 2025-2026)
- Record win in any league: 8:0 (against Hapoel Ramla F.C. 1949–50, Jerusalem District League)
- Record win in the first league: 8:1 (against Maccabi Herzliya F.C. 1994–95, Liga Leumit then 1St league)
- Record win in Toto Cup: 8:0 (against F.C. Ashdod) 2010–11
- Record European win: 5:1 (against Floriana F.C., 1996–97, in UEFA Cup Preliminary round)
- Record defeat (and league defeat): 0:7 (against Maccabi Tel Aviv 2000–01, Israel Premier League)
- Record European defeat: 0:6 (against S.L. Benfica, 1998–99, in UEFA Champions League 2nd qualifying round)
- Highest Number of Goals Scored in one European game: 7, Twice: In 2017/2018 Europa League preliminary win against Vasas 4:3, In 2025-2026 UEFA Conference League preliminary win 5:2 against FK Sutjeska Nikšić.
- Longest game winning streak: 19 (during 1966–68 season in league A)
- Longest game winning streak in the 1St League: 9 (during 1996–97 season)
- Most wins in a season (1St League): 22 wins in the 1992–93 season, in 33 games, 22 wins in the 2025-2026 season, in 36 games.
- Most points in a season (3 points per win, 1St League): 76 points in the 2025-2026 season.
- Most League goals scored in a season (1St League): 78 goals in the 2025-2026 season in 36 games. 161 goals in a double-season of 1966–68 in "league A", then the second league.
- Biggest point margin from the runners-up (winning the 1St League championship): 15 points in the 1986–87 season
- Biggest goal difference in a season (1St League): +42 in the 1996–97 season
- Fewest goals conceded in a season (1St League): 14 in the 1977–78 season
- Longest time period in the IPL without conceding a goal: 928 minutes in the 1974–75 season
- Longest sequence of scoring in each league games (IPL): 43, since the last 6 games of 2016–17 on 22/4/2017 continuing as long as the whole 36 league games of 2017–18, and the 1st game of 2018–19, on 27/8/2018.

=== Individual records ===
- Most League appearances: Uri Malmilian, 423 appearances
- Most European appearances: Itzik Kornfein, 23 appearances
- Oldest first-team player: Arnest Weinberger, 40 years, 363 days (against Maccabi Rehovot F.C., 30 March 1957)
- Most appearances in Israeli national team: Uri Malmilian, 62 appearances
- Most League goals: Eli Ohana, 142 goals
- Most State cup goals: Uri Malmilian, 29 goals
- Most European goals: István Sallói, 12 goals
- Most goals scored for the national team (while being player for the team): Ronen Harazi, 18 goals
- Highest goalscorer for one match: Simon Alfasi, 6 goals (against Degel-zion Tel Aviv, 29 November 1947)
- Highest goalscorer in one season (30 games): Eli Miali 18 goals (in the 1978–79 season)
- Longest time period without conceding a goal (GK):Yosef Surijnov, 928 minutes in the 1974–75 season

== Former players ==
=== Most appearances ===
Rank	Name	Period	Games	Goals
1	(Israel) Uri Malmilian	1973–89	423	140
2	(Israel) Hanan Azulay	1974–89	396	41
3	(Israel) Itzhak Jano	1968–83	375	9
4	(Israel) Yossi Mizrahi	1972–88	371	0
5	(Israel) Itzik Kornfein	1995–07	366	0
6	(Israel) Eli Ohana	1980–87; 1991–99	345	142
6	(Israel) Yossi Hacham	1965–80	345	1
8	(Israel) Shaul Mizrahi	1953–70	304	40
9	(Israel) Eitan Mizrahi	1989–03	299	12
10	(Israel) Sammy Malka	1980–92	288	47
11	(Israel) Udi Rubowitch	1963–74	281	81
12	(Israel) Meir Kadosh	1984–95	279	0
12	(Israel) Ya'akov Schwartz	1983–94	279	35
14	(Israel) Danny Noyman	1971–80; 1982–84	264	34
15	(Israel) Shlomi Avrahami	1960–73	260	20
16	(Israel) David Amsalem	1995–98; 2000–09	252	11
17	(Ukraine) Serhiy Tretyak	1992–00	239	3
18	(Israel) Aviram Baruchyan	2002–12	237	36
19	(Israel) Itzhak Monsa	1958–68	235	51
20	(Israel) Hai Mizrahi	1954–65	229	1
20	(Israel) Yossi Avrahami	1974–84	229	18

=== Most league goals ===
Rank	Name	Period	Games	Goals
1	(Israel) Eli Ohana	1980–87; 1991–99	345	142
2	(Israel) Uri Malmilian	1973–89	423	140
3	(Peru) Raul Geller	1965–69	137	87
4	(Israel) Udi Rubowitch	1963–74	281	81
5	(Israel) Yossi Aminof	1957–67; 1970–73	157	74
6	(Hungary) István Sallói	1994–99	116	59
7	(Israel) Ronen Harazi	1992–97	134	58
8	(Israel) Barak Itzhaki	2003–07; 2008–10	181	57
9	(Israel) Haim Azulay	1962–72	176	53
10	(Israel) Itzhak Monsa	1958–68	235	51

=== Player of the year ===
Year	Winner
2004–05	(Israel) Avi Nimni
2005–06	(Israel) Yoav Ziv
2006–07	(Israel) Michael Zandberg
2007–08	(Israel) Gal Alberman
2008–09	(Israel) Barak Yitzhaki
2009–10	(Israel) Ariel Harush
2010–11	(Israel) Kobi Moyal
2011–12	(Israel) Eli Cohen I (manager)
2012–13	(Israel) Ofir Kriaf
2013–14	(Israel) Ariel Harush
2014–15	(Israel) Shlomi Azulay
2015–16	(Israel) Dan Einbinder
2016–17	(Israel) Idan Vered

== Players ==
=== Current squad ===
As of 19 September 2026

No.	Pos.	Nation	Player
2	DF	GHA	Nana Antwi
4	DF	COL	Brayan Carabalí
5	DF	ISR	Gil Cohen
7	FW	ISR	Yarden Shua (captain)
8	MF	ISR	Ziv Ben Shimol
9	FW	NGR	Johnbosco Kalu
10	MF	ISR	Adi Yona
11	FW	ISR	Timothy Muzie
13	FW	GHA	Eugene Ansah
14	DF	ISR	Roey Elimelech
15	MF	ISR	Noam Muche
16	DF	ISR	Yarden Cohen
18	FW	ISR	Ravid Abergil

No.	Pos.	Nation	Player
19	FW	ISR	Shon Weissman
22	GK	ISR	Yehonathan Ozer
25	DF	ISR	Liel Deri
26	MF	ISR	Degats Worko
30	MF	ISR	Tomer Yosefi
33	GK	ISR	Dvir Nir
40	MF	CMR	Boris Enow
44	DF	GEO	Luka Gadrani
55	GK	POR	Miguel Silva
77	FW	ISR	Omer Atzili
91	DF	ISR	Nevo Shedo
—	MF	COL	Alexis Serna
—	FW	ISR	Ori Azo (on loan from Maccabi Tel Aviv)

=== Other players under contract ===
No.	Pos.	Nation	Player
—	DF	ISR	Yuval Shalev

=== Out on loan ===
Note: Flags indicate national team as defined under FIFA eligibility rules; some limited exceptions apply. Players may hold more than one non-FIFA nationality.

No.	Pos.	Nation	Player
—	GK	ISR	Roy Sason (on loan to Maccabi Bnei Reineh until 30 June 2027)
—	DF	ISR	Amit Hilo (on loan to Ironi Modi'in until 30 June 2027)
—	MF	ISR	Sagi Israeli (on loan to Maccabi Jaffa until 30 June 2027)

No.	Pos.	Nation	Player
—	MF	ISR	Ilay Hagag (on loan to Bnei Sakhnin until 30 June 2027)
—	MF	ISR	Tzahi Itzhak (on loan to Maccabi Kiryat Gat until 30 June 2027)
—	MF	ISR	Nadav Markovich (on loan to Ironi Kiryat Shmona until 30 June 2027)

=== Foreigners 2024/25 ===
Only up to six non-Israeli nationals can be in an Israeli club squad. Those married to an Israeli, or those with Jewish ancestry can claim a passport or permanent residency which would allow them to play with Israeli status.

- (Portugal) Miguel Silva

== Managers ==
- Israel Halivner (1968–70)
- (Israel) Arie Radler (1971–72)
- (Israel) Emmanuel Scheffer (1979–80)
- (Israel) Arie Radler (1980–81)
- (Israel) Eliyahu Offer (1981–82)
- (Israel) Dror Kashtan (1985–87)
- (Israel) Eliyahu Offer (1988)
- (Israel) Dror Kashtan (1988–89)
- (Israel) Ze'ev Seltzer (1989–91)
- (Israel) Michael Kadosh (1991–92)
- (Israel) Dror Kashtan (1 July 1992 – 30 June 1994)
- (Israel) Amatsia Levkovich (First 4 games of 1994–95)
- (Israel) Yossi Mizrahi (1994–95)
- (Israel) Eli Cohen I (1 July 1995 – 30 June 1997)
- (Israel) Dror Kashtan (1 July 1997 – 30 June 1999)
- (Israel) Eli Ohana (1 July 1999 – 30 June 2000)
- (Israel) Eli Guttman (July 2000 – 1 March 2001)
- (Israel) Yossi Mizrahi (June 2001 – July 2001)
- (Israel) Eli Cohen I (1 July 2001 – 30 June 2003)
- (Israel) Eli Ohana (1 July 2003 – 30 June 2005)
- (Netherlands) Ton Caanen (5 June 2005 – 12 December 2005)
- (France) Luis Fernández (13 December 2005 – 6 June 2006)
- (Argentina) Osvaldo Ardiles (1 July 2006 – 18 October 2006)
- (Israel) Yossi Mizrahi (Oct 2006 – 7 June 2007)
- (Israel) Itzhak Shum (1 July 2007 – 1 September 2008)
- (Israel) Reuven Atar (2 September 2008 – 30 June 2009)
- (Israel) Itzhak Shum (1 July 2009 – 20 February 2010)
- (Israel) David Amsalem (April 2010 – 11 June 2010)
- (Israel) Uri Malmilian (1 July 2010 – 17 January 2011)
- (Israel) Ronny Levy (17 January 2011 – 10 June 2011)
- (Israel) David Amsalem (10 June 2011 – 17 August 2011)
- (Israel) Yuval Naim (17 August 2011 – 8 February 2012)
- (Israel) Hanan Azulay (interim) (9 February 2012 – 13 February 2012)
- (Israel) Eli Cohen I (13 February 2012 – 4 May 2013)
- (Israel) Eli Cohen II (4 May 2013 – 3 December 2013)
- (Israel) David Amsalem (interim) (3 December 2013 – 9 December 2013)
- (Israel) Ronny Levy (9 December 2013 – 10 May 2014)
- (Israel) Meni Koretski (10 May 2014 – 15 January 2015)
- (Israel) Guy Levy (interim) (January 2015 – 15 June)
- (Israel) (Serbia) Slobodan Drapić (7 June 2015 – 1 June 2016)
- (Israel) Ran Ben Shimon (8 June 2016 – 5 February 2017)
- (Israel) Sharon Mimer (6 February 2017 – 16 August 2017)
- (Israel) Gili Levanda (3 September 2017 – 28 September 2017)
- (Israel) Benny Ben Zaken (28 September 2017 – 1 June 2018)
- (Israel) Guy Luzon (27 May 2018 – 22 October 2018)
- (Israel) Nir Klinger (29 October 2018 – 4 June 2019)
- (Israel) Ronny Levy (6 June 2019 – 28 August 2020)
- (Israel) (Serbia) Slobodan Drapić (4 September 2020 – 20 March 2021)
- (Netherlands) Erwin Koeman (3 June 2021 – 1 December 2021)
- (Israel) Yossi Mizrahi (9 December 2021 – 26 January 2022)
- (Israel) Yossi Abukasis (3 February 2022 - 31 January 2024)
- (Israel) Gal Cohen (1 February 2024 - 19 February 2024)
- (Israel) Barak Itzhaki (19 February 2024 - 31 May 2026)
- (Israel) Almog Cohen (31 May 2026 - Present)
