= Bar Zohar =

Bar Zohar (Hebrew: בר זוהר) is a surname. Notable people with the surname include:

- Yael Bar-Zohar (born 1980), Israeli actress, model, and television host
- Michael Bar Zohar (born 1938), Israeli historian, novelist, and politician

== See also ==
- Zohar (name)
