= Itzik Kornfein =

Israeli footballer

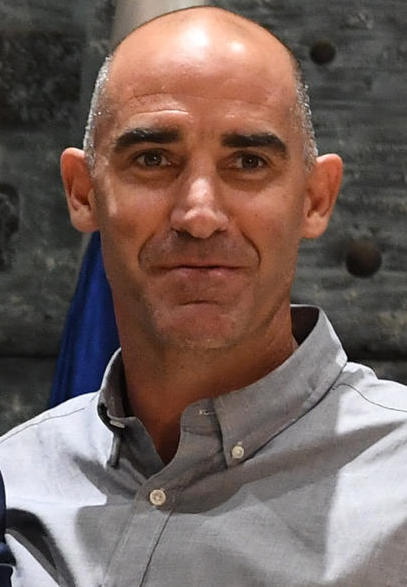

Personal information
- Full name: Itzhak Kornfein
- Date of birth: 24 September 1971 (age 55)
- Place of birth: Jerusalem, Israel
- Height: 1.86 m (6 ft 1 in)
- Position: Goalkeeper

Youth career
- Hapoel Jerusalem

Senior career*
Years	Team	Apps	(Gls)
1989–1990	Hapoel Tiberias		
1990–1991	Hapoel Jerusalem		
1991–1993	Hapoel Ramat Gan		
1993–1994	Hapoel Petah Tikva	8	(0)
1994–1995	Beitar Tel Aviv		
1995–2007	Beitar Jerusalem	372	(0)

International career
1990	Israel U18	1	(0)
1992–1993	Israel U21	14	(0)
1996–2000	Israel	5	(0)
- * Club domestic league appearances and goals

Yitzhak "Itzik" Kornfein (Hebrew: יצחק "איציק" קורנפיין; born 24 September 1971 in Jerusalem) is a retired Israeli goalkeeper who played mostly for Beitar Jerusalem. He also played for Hapoel Tiberias, Hapoel Jerusalem, Hapoel Ramat Gan, Hapoel Petah Tikva and Beitar Tel Aviv. In international football, Kornfein was capped at under-18 and under-21 level, and played five times for the senior national team.

Kornfein started playing for the youth team of Hapoel Jerusalem but after moving to Beitar in 1995, he became a true symbol and icon for Beitar fans. In his last 6 years as an active player, Kornfein was the captain of the Beitar Jerusalem squad.

Kornfein won five titles as a player for Beitar : 3 Championships : 1997, 1998, 2007 1 Toto cup 1997/8 (23 December 1997) 1 Peace cup 2000 (10 September 2000, in Rome) including back-to-back Championships in 1997 and 1998. Few days before the beginning of training sessions previous to the 07-08 playing season, Kornfein announced his retirement as a player. He was then named as the club's general manager.

Kornfein holds a BA in Economics and Marketing from the Open University of Israel, and an MA in Business Administration from the Hebrew University of Jerusalem.
