= Dror Kashtan =

Israeli football manager (1944–2024)

Dror Kashtan דרור קשטן
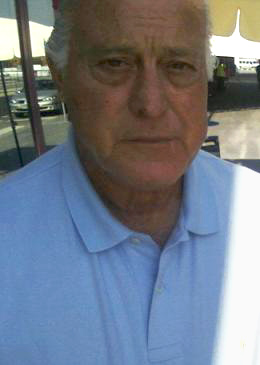
- Kashtan in 2011

Personal information
- Date of birth: 1 October 1944
- Place of birth: Petah Tikva, Mandatory Palestine
- Date of death: 15 January 2024 (aged 79)
- Position: Defensive midfielder

Senior career*
Years	Team	Apps	(Gls)
1962–1975	Hapoel Petah Tikva	95	(0)
1975–1976	Hapoel Kfar Saba	45	(0)

International career
- Israel U19
1962	Israel	3	(0)

Managerial career
- 1977: Hapoel Kfar Saba
- 1977–1978: Hapoel Kiryat Ono
- 1978–1980: Hapoel Lod
- 1980–1983: Hapoel Kfar Saba
- 1983–1984: Hapoel Lod
- 1984–1985: Israel U21
- 1985–1987: Beitar Jerusalem
- 1987–1988: Maccabi Haifa
- 1988–1989: Beitar Jerusalem
- 1989–1990: Hapoel Ramat Gan
- 1991–1992: Maccabi Petah Tikva
- 1992–1994: Beitar Jerusalem
- 1994–1995: Hapoel Haifa
- 1995–1996: Maccabi Tel Aviv
- 1996–1997: Hapoel Tel Aviv
- 1997–1999: Beitar Jerusalem
- 1999–2004: Hapoel Tel Aviv
- 2004–2005: Hapoel Petah Tikva
- 2005–2006: Hapoel Tel Aviv
- 2006–2010: Israel
- 2010–2011: Bnei Yehuda
- 2011–2012: Hapoel Tel Aviv
- 2012–2013: Bnei Yehuda
- * Club domestic league appearances and goals

Dror Kashtan (Hebrew: דרור קשטן; 1 October 1944 – 15 January 2024) was an Israeli football player and manager.

== Biography ==
Dror Kashtan was born in Petah Tikva during the British Mandate for Palestine.

== Sports career ==
As a player, he represented the Israel national team three times. As a manager, he took charge of numerous clubs as well as the Israel under-21 team, and the senior national team in 2006–2010.

Kashtan started out as a player for Hapoel Petah Tikva. He was the only Israeli player to be called up to the full national team before playing a single match in league play. In 1977, after playing for Hapoel Kfar Saba, he became the team coach.

Kashtan has been called the most successful manager of all time in Israeli football, with six championships, six State Cups and three Toto Cups won under his direction.

== Honours ==
=== As player ===
- Israeli Premier League: 1962–63
- AFC Youth Championship: 1964

=== As manager ===
- Israeli Premier League (6): 1981–82, 1986–87, 1992–93, 1995–96, 1997–98, 1999–2000
- Israel State Cup (6): 1984, 1986, 1989, 1996, 2000, 2006
- Toto Cup (3): 1997–98, 2001–02, 2004–05
