= Itzik Zohar =

Israeli former footballer

Itzik Zohar איציק זוהר
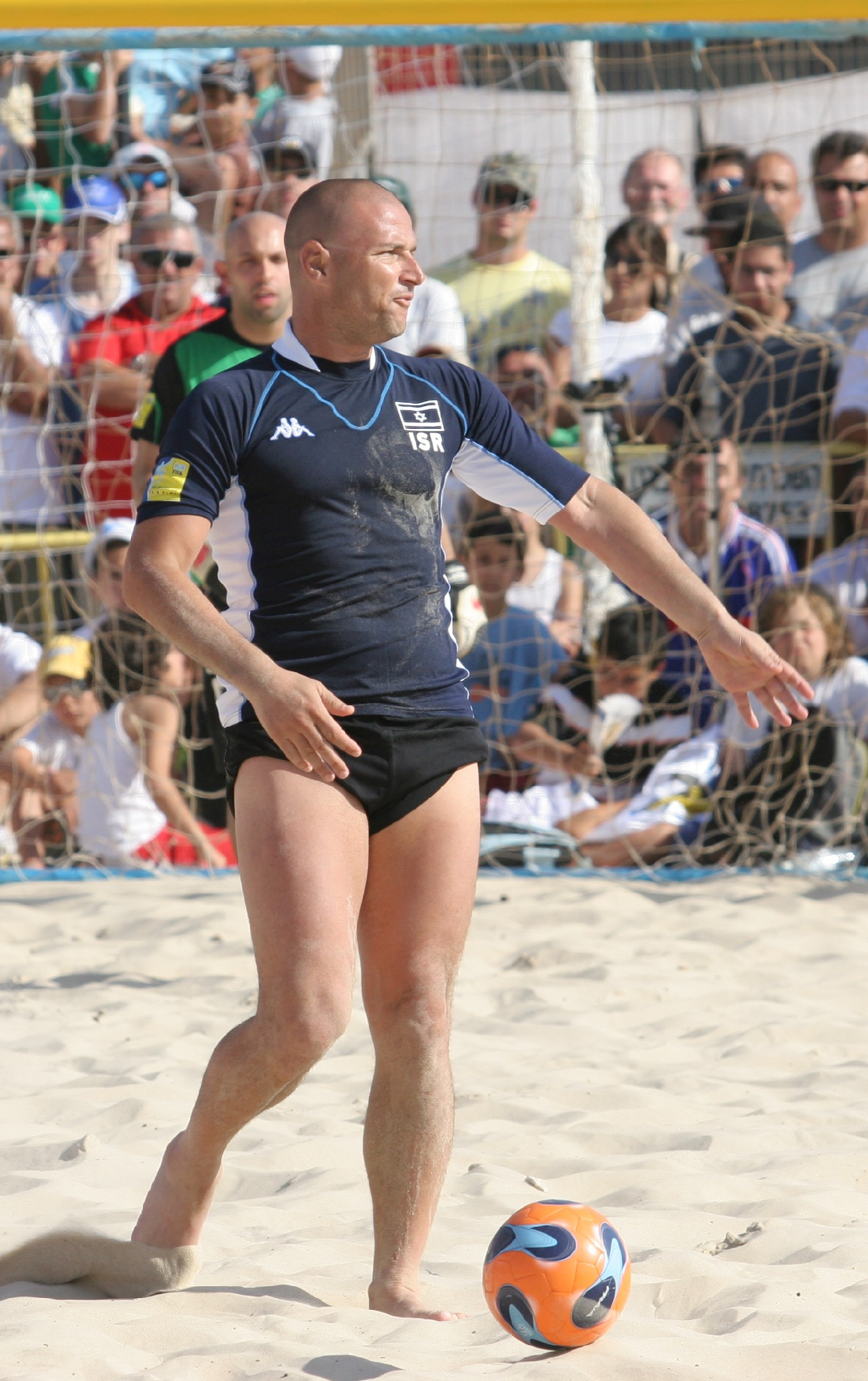

Personal information
- Full name: Itzhak Zohar יצחק זוהר
- Date of birth: 31 October 1970 (age 55)
- Place of birth: Bat Yam, Israel
- Height: 1.90 m (6 ft 3 in)
- Position: Attacking midfielder

Youth career
- 1978–1987: Maccabi Jaffa

Senior career*
Years	Team	Apps	(Gls)
1987–1988	Maccabi Jaffa	14	(2)
1988–1994	Maccabi Tel Aviv	165	(26)
1994–1995	Royal Antwerp	24	(6)
1995–1996	Maccabi Tel Aviv	21	(9)
1996–1997	Beitar Jerusalem	29	(14)
1997–1998	Crystal Palace	6	(0)
1998	Maccabi Haifa	10	(4)
1998–1999	Maccabi Tel Aviv	7	(2)
1999	Maccabi Herzliya	17	(2)
2000–2001	Maccabi Netanya	66	(29)
2002–2003	Beitar Jerusalem	45	(17)
2003–2004	F.C. Ashdod	12	(3)
2004–2005	Hapoel Nazareth Illit	3	(0)

International career
1990–1991	Israel U21	2	(0)
1992–2001	Israel	31	(9)
2007–2008	Israel (beach soccer)	2	(1)
- * Club domestic league appearances and goals

Itzik Zohar (Hebrew: איציק זוהר; born October 31, 1970) is an Israeli former international footballer and television sports personality. Born in Bat Yam, Israel to a family of North African extraction, he holds the distinction of scoring the first two goals for Israel in its first World Cup qualifier in the UEFA confederation on October 28, 1992. He is widely regarded as having been one of the best free kick takers in Israeli football.

== Biography ==
Zohar grew up in a ma'abara (transit camp) on the border of Bat Yam and Jaffa, where the family's ramshackle hut was not even sufficient to protect them from the elements. Due to the unsavory conditions of the neighborhood, Zohar's father encouraged the children to play football in order to stay off the streets. His Tunisian-Jewish family was so poor, that often Zohar would find himself walking back from football practices because he could not afford the bus.

Zohar was married to Ilana for ten years and the couple have two children, Gavriel and Michael. In an interview with Iton Tel Aviv, Zohar claims that he spends much time with his children and has watched Finding Nemo over 17 times. He is a religious Jew and a close friend of Ashdod's Rabbi Pinto. On December 9, 2007, Zohar was arrested for alleged tax evasion from 1988–2002. He was released on ₪1.8 million bail. In June 2008, Zohar was attacked on a main street in Tel Aviv by an unknown person; he was attacked with a broken bottle, and had to be treated with 52 stitches on the right side of his face. In January 2011, Zohar was attacked again in Tel Aviv while partying at a nightclub in the same method; an unknown person broke a bottle on his head which resulted in injuries in his head and hand.

== Football career ==
A product of the Maccabi Jaffa youth system, both he and his brother, Avivi, became professional footballers. Itzik's professional debut was in a Liga Artzit match with childhood club Maccabi Jaffa against Hakoah Ramat Gan which ended in a 0:0 draw. After finishing the season in ninth place, Zohar was bought by Maccabi Tel Aviv where he won his first top flight championship in the 1991–92 season. The transfer price was US $90,000, which was a rather large amount in Israeli football at the time. During his time at Maccabi Tel Aviv, Zohar played with Uri Malmilian, who he credits for having taught him a lot. His debut was made for the Israel national football team in a friendly against the USSR. Two months later, he scored his first international goal, also in a friendly, against Iceland. All this was just a warmup for his big national team break when Israel played its first world cup qualifier in the UEFA confederation. Although Israel lost to Austria 5–2, Zohar was able to celebrate a personal achievement as he scored Israel's first two goals as a full member of UEFA. Zohar added another piece of hardware (the Israel State Cup) in 1993–94 before leaving Israel for Belgian club Royal Antwerp. Zohar returned home though after he came down with jaundice and credits this for the reason why he didn't stay in Belgium. He then returned to Maccabi Tel Aviv where he took the "double".

After another league title, this time with Beitar Jerusalem in 1996–97, Zohar was sold to English club Crystal Palace for £1,200,000 but quickly returned to Israel after failing to make an impression at the club. In a league match against Southampton, Zohar stepped up to take a penalty kick in place of regular penalty kick taker, Bruce Dyer. His weakly hit shot cost Palace the win and so his reputation with the supporters was forever tainted. His dismal performances for Palace caused him to be voted by the fans as one of the top ten worst signings. In April 2012 Talk Sport magazine rated Zohar as Crystal Palace's Worst Foreign player. After returning from England, he was signed by Maccabi Haifa, as a replacement for Ukrainian midfielder Serhiy Kandaurov, who was sold to Portugal's Benfica. Haifa manager, Daniel Brailovsky was disappointed with Zohar's performances during practices and decided to let him languish on the bench during the season. After a falling out with Brailovsky, Zohar joined Maccabi Tel Aviv for his third stint but suffered an injury that saw him off the pitch for about 10 months. In retrospect, he later credited this injury to be the hardest part of his footballing career.

Once recovered from injury, Zohar regained his fitness at Maccabi Herzliya before joining Maccabi Netanya. Zohar was an instant success and started to receive money off the pitch as a spokesperson for local brands. His career was dealt a setback when he was caught hurling racial slurs towards Tzafririm Holon's Ziv Caveda (an Israeli footballer of Ethiopian extraction). In his defense, he claimed that his comments were directed at Holon's Hamisi Amani-Dove (an African American). The event startled the Israel Football Association which never had racism between players on the field and had no punishment system in place for it. Aside from receiving a one match ban and ₪5,000 fine, Zohar was publicly lambasted for his words that shook up the football world in Israel that was in the middle of promoting racial equality in Israel. After being released from his contract in Netanya, club manager, Uri Malmilian, left the club in protest. Zohar rejoined Beitar, where he was a central part of the club and helped steer the club away from the relegation zone of the table. He continued there for another season after which he announced he was retiring from football.

Zohar began to look toward a life after football before F.C. Ashdod was able to coax Zohar out of retirement. In 2003, he opened up a bar-restaurant, called Saga, in the Tel Aviv marina. At the time, it looked like things were working out again on the pitch, though he later announced his retirement for a second time before coming out of retirement for a second time to join Hapoel Nazareth Illit. It was a short lived return though as Zohar only managed three games before announcing on February 14, 2005 that he was hanging up his boots for good.

== Acting career ==
After hanging up his boots, Zohar began to split his time between a number of different projects. Remaining a celebrity in Israel, he is the face of Gillette, Careline and many other brands in Israel. He is a regular guest on the football wrapup show on Israel 10 as well as other sports related programmes. As an actor, he had a role on a television programme called, "The Show", but it was canceled shortly after a couple of episodes. On the side, he also dabbles in the Tel Aviv real estate market.

== Beach football ==
On June 1, 2007 Zohar was in the starting line up of the first ever Israel national beach soccer team. In his first competitive match, Zohar scored a goal as Israel beat their English counterparts by a score of 6–5 in Netanya, Israel. He was originally going to be a part of the squad for the qualification round of the European beach football championship in Athens, Greece, but pulled out due to injury. Locally, Zohar represents the city of Rosh HaAyin in Israel's inaugural beach football league.

== Statistics ==
Club performance			League		Cup		League Cup		Continental		Total	
Season	Club	League	Apps	Goals	Apps	Goals	Apps	Goals	Apps	Goals	Apps	Goals
Israel			League		Israel State Cup		Toto Cup		Europe		Total	
1987–88	Maccabi Jaffa	Liga Artzit	14	2					—		14	2
1988–89	Maccabi Tel Aviv	Liga Leumit	24	1	2	0	4	1	—		30	2
1989–90	Maccabi Tel Aviv	Liga Leumit	22	2	2	0	5	1	—		27	3
1990–91	Maccabi Tel Aviv	Liga Leumit	31	7	3	0	5	0	—		39	7
1991–92	Maccabi Tel Aviv	Liga Leumit	32	14	6	2	4	1	—		44	17
1992–93	Maccabi Tel Aviv	Liga Leumit	32	13	4	2	6	3	2	0	44	18
1993–94	Maccabi Tel Aviv	Liga Leumit	37	22	4	4	4	0	1	0	47	26
Total	Israel		179	61	21	8	28	6	3	0	231	75
Belgium			League		Belgian Cup		League Cup		Europe		Total	
1994–95	Royal Antwerp	First Division	24	6	0	0	—		2	0	26	6
Total	Belgium		24	6	0	0			2	0	26	6
Israel			League		Israel State Cup		Toto Cup		Europe		Total	
1995–96	Maccabi Tel Aviv	Liga Leumit	21	9	4	1	3	0	2	0	30	10
1996–97	Beitar Jerusalem	Liga Leumit	29	14	4	1			4	0	37	15
Total	Israel		50	23	8	2			6	0		
England			League		FA Cup		League Cup		Europe		Total	
1997	Crystal Palace	Premier League	6	0	0	0	3	0	0	0	9	0
Total	England		6	0	0	0	3	0	0	0	9	0
Israel			League		Israel State Cup		Toto Cup		Europe		Total	
1998	Maccabi Haifa	Liga Leumit	10	4	3	2	-	-	-	-	13	6
1998–99	Maccabi Tel Aviv	Liga Leumit	7	2	1	0	-	-	—		8	2
1999–00	Maccabi Herzliya	Israel Premier League	17	2	-	-	-	-	—		17	2
1999–00	Maccabi Netanya	Israel Premier League	18	10	1	0	-	-	-	-	19	10
2000–01	Maccabi Netanya	Israel Premier League	33	14	-	-	-	-	-	-	33	14
2001–02	Maccabi Netanya	Israel Premier League	15	5	-	-	-	-	-	-	15	5
2001–02	Beitar Jerusalem	Israel Premier League	17	6	2	1	-	-	-	-	19	7
2002–03	Beitar Jerusalem	Israel Premier League	28	11	-	-	1	0	-	-	29	11
2003–04	F.C. Ashdod	Israel Premier League	12	3	3	0	-	-	—		15	3
2004–05	Hapoel Nazareth Illit	Israel Premier League	3	0	-	-	-	-	—		3	0
Total	Israel		389	141	39	13	29	6	9	0	466	160
Total	Belgium		24	6	0	0	0	0	2	0	26	6
Total	England		6	0	0	0	3	0	0	0	9	0
Career total			419	147	39	13	32	6	11	0	501	166

== Honours ==
- With Maccabi Tel Aviv:
  - Israeli Premier League (2): 1991–92, 1995–96
  - State Cup (2): 1994, 1996
  - Toto Cup (2): 1992–93, 1998–99
- With Beitar Jerusalem:
  - Israeli Premier League (1): 1996–97
- With Maccabi Haifa:
  - State Cup (1): 1998

== See also ==
- List of select Jewish football (association; soccer) players
