= 1983–84 Liga Leumit =

Liga Leumit
- Season: 1983–84
- Champions: Maccabi Haifa; 1st title
- Relegated: Bnei Yehuda; Maccabi Ramat Amidar; Hapoel Yehud
- Top goalscorer: David Lavi (17)

The 1983–84 Liga Leumit season began on 24 September 1983 and ended on 26 May 1984, with Maccabi Haifa winning their first ever title. David Lavi of Maccabi Netanya was the league's top scorer with 17 goals.

Bnei Yehuda, Maccabi Ramat Amidar and Hapoel Yehud were all relegated to Liga Artzit.

== Final table ==
Pos	Team	Pld	W	D	L	GF	GA	GD	Pts	Qualification or relegation
1	Maccabi Haifa (C)	30	16	9	5	48	28	+20	57	
2	Beitar Jerusalem	30	15	11	4	45	27	+18	56	Qualification for the Intertoto Cup
3	Hapoel Tel Aviv	30	12	11	7	40	27	+13	47	Qualification for the Intertoto Cup
4	Maccabi Netanya	30	11	9	10	52	49	+3	42	
5	Maccabi Tel Aviv	30	10	11	9	41	34	+7	41	
6	Beitar Tel Aviv	30	11	7	12	41	40	+1	40	
7	Hapoel Be'er Sheva	30	11	6	13	34	37	−3	39	
8	Hapoel Lod	30	9	11	10	31	39	−8	38	
9	Maccabi Petah Tikva	30	8	13	9	26	26	0	37	
10	Maccabi Jaffa	30	8	13	9	34	39	−5	37	
11	Hakoah Ramat Gan	30	10	7	13	29	38	−9	37	
12	Shimshon Tel Aviv	30	8	12	10	36	35	+1	36	
13	Maccabi Yavne	30	9	9	12	26	34	−8	36	
14	Bnei Yehuda (R)	35	8	10	17	27	36	−9	34	Relegated to Liga Artzit
15	Maccabi Ramat Amidar (R)	35	7	11	17	31	42	−11	32	Relegated to Liga Artzit
16	Hapoel Yehud (R)	34	7	10	17	28	38	−10	31	Relegated to Liga Artzit

Source: rsssf.com
(C) Champions; (R) Relegated

== Results ==
Home \ Away	BEI	BTA	BnY	HAR	HBS	HLD	HTA	HYE	MHA	MNE	MJA	MPT	MRA	MTA	MYV	STA
Beitar Jerusalem	—	1–1	2–1	4–1	2–1	1–0	1–3	2–1	2–1	2–2	1–1	0–2	0–0	0–0	2–0	2–0
Beitar Tel Aviv	1–3	—	4–0	4–1	0–3	0–0	3–2	1–1	2–0	1–2	2–4	1–5	1–1	1–1	1–0	1–1
Bnei Yehuda	0–1	0–2	—	0–0	2–0	2–2	2–2	1–0	0–0	2–2	1–1	2–1	1–0	1–2	1–0	0–0
Hakoah Ramat Gan	0–0	0–2	1–2	—	1–0	2–1	0–0	1–2	0–1	3–3	1–0	1–1	0–1	1–0	1–0	2–0
Hapoel Be'er Sheva	0–2	2–1	1–0	1–1	—	2–1	1–4	2–1	2–2	2–1	2–0	0–2	1–0	2–0	3–1	0–1
Hapoel Lod	0–2	2–1	0–0	3–2	1–2	—	0–0	2–0	2–0	2–1	1–3	0–0	2–1	0–4	1–0	2–1
Hapoel Tel Aviv	2–3	2–0	0–1	0–2	2–2	2–1	—	1–1	1–1	1–3	0–1	2–0	3–0	1–0	0–0	1–0
Hapoel Yehud	0–0	0–2	1–1	0–1	2–1	4–0	0–0	—	0–1	2–1	0–0	0–0	1–1	0–0	4–3	1–3
Maccabi Haifa	2–1	2–0	1–1	1–0	2–0	2–2	0–1	2–0	—	2–1	3–0	4–1	1–0	2–0	1–1	1–1
Maccabi Netanya	0–0	1–3	3–1	0–1	2–1	2–2	1–4	1–0	1–1	—	1–1	2–0	5–3	1–2	3–2	3–2
Maccabi Jaffa	2–1	1–3	3–1	0–2	0–0	0–0	0–0	3–1	1–3	2–2	—	1–1	2–1	2–1	1–1	2–2
Maccabi Petah Tikva	1–1	1–0	2–1	0–1	1–0	0–0	1–1	0–2	1–3	0–0	2–0	—	3–0	0–0	0–0	0–0
Maccabi Ramat Amidar	1–4	1–0	2–1	2–2	1–0	1–1	1–1	1–2	3–2	1–3	2–2	2–0	—	2–2	2–0	0–0
Maccabi Tel Aviv	1–1	1–1	1–0	4–1	2–2	0–2	1–2	4–0	2–3	1–2	1–1	1–1	2–1	—	2–1	1–1
Maccabi Yavne	1–1	2–0	1–0	2–1	1–0	0–0	1–0	1–0	2–2	3–2	1–0	1–0	0–0	0–2	—	1–1
Shimshon Tel Aviv	2–3	2–0	1–2	3–0	1–1	4–1	0–2	2–2	0–2	2–1	2–0	0–0	0–0	2–3	2–1	—

Legend: Blue = home team win; Yellow = draw; Red = away team win.
