= Avivi Zohar =

Israeli footballer

Avivi Zohar אביבי זוהר
Personal information
- Date of birth: December 4, 1972 (age 53)
- Place of birth: Bat Yam, Israel
- Position: Midfielder

Team information
- Current team: F.C. Holon Yermiyahu

Youth career
- Maccabi Jaffa

Senior career*
Years	Team	Apps	(Gls)
1989–1993	Maccabi Jaffa		
1993–1996	Hapoel Haifa		
1996–1997	Hapoel Ashkelon		
1998–2000	Hapoel Beit She'an		
2000–2001	Hakoah Ramat Gan		
2001–2002	Beitar Be'er Sheva	19	(6)
2007–2008	A.C. Ramat Elyahu		
2008–2009	Maccabi Kabilio Jaffa	27	(32)

International career
1992–1993	Israel U21	3	(1)

Managerial career
- 2009: Maccabi Kabilio Jaffa
- 2020–2021: Hapoel Lod
- 2021–: F.C. Holon Yermiyahu
- * Club domestic league appearances and goals

Avivi Zohar (Hebrew: אביבי זוהר; born December 4, 1972) is an Israeli former footballer. He spent a large portion of his career with Maccabi Jaffa in Israel. At international level, Zohar was capped for the Israel national under-21 football team. He is the younger brother of Israel international player Itzik Zohar, who also played for Jaffa, but left for neighbors Maccabi Tel Aviv.

== Honours ==
- Toto Cup (Artzit) (2):
  - 1991–92,1992–93
- Liga Gimel (1):
  - 2008–09
