= Danny Neuman =

Israeli footballer, manager, and sports commentator

Danny Neuman דני נוימן
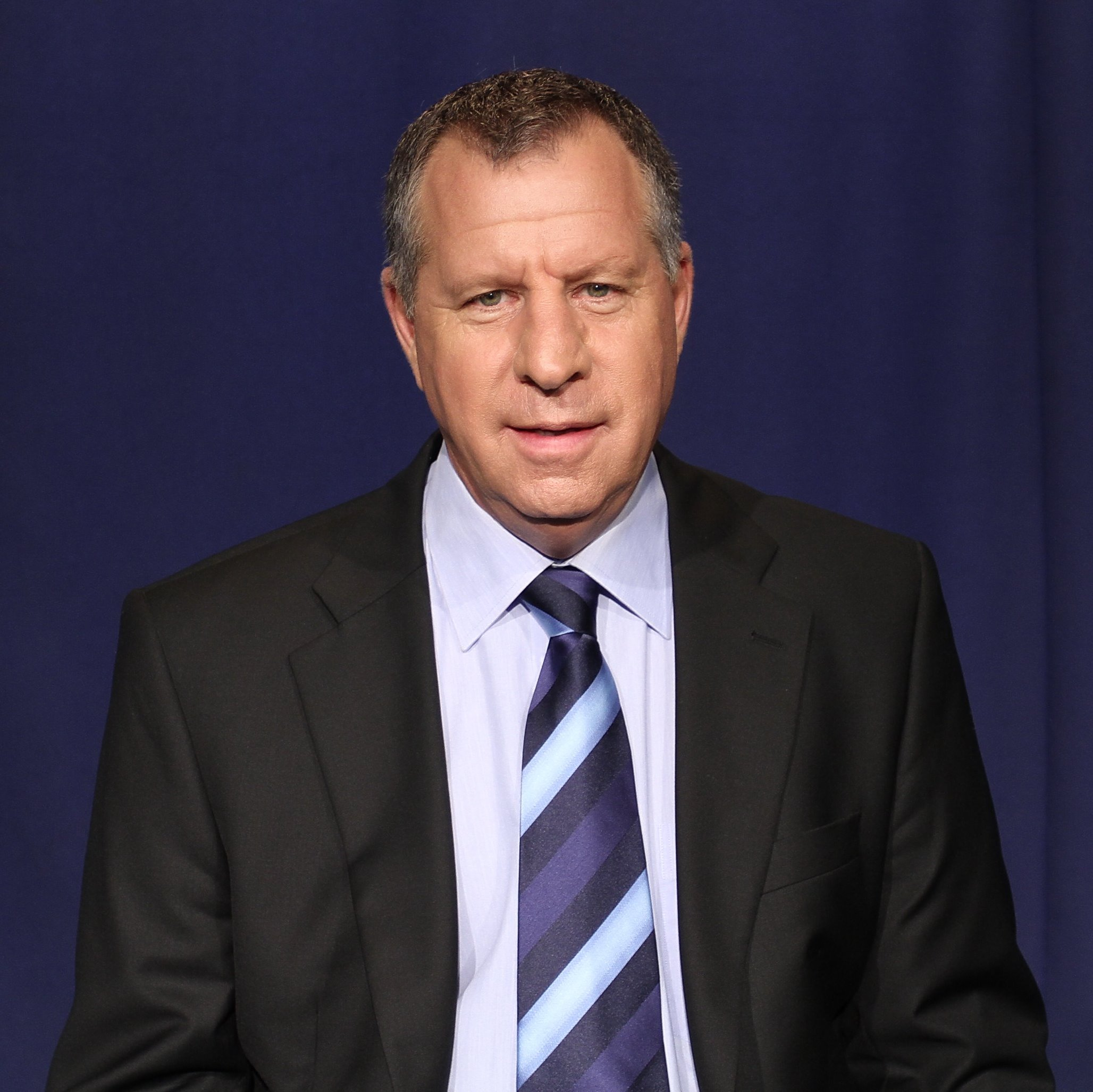

Personal information
- Date of birth: February 8, 1955 (age 71)
- Place of birth: Jerusalem, Israel
- Position: Midfielder

Youth career
- Beitar Jerusalem

Senior career*
Years	Team	Apps	(Gls)
1971–1980	Beitar Jerusalem		
1980–1982	Maccabi Tel Aviv		
1983–1984	Beitar Jerusalem		

International career
1976–1979	Israel	9	(0)

Managerial career
- Maccabi Kiryat Gat
- Beitar Ramla
- Hapoel Yehud
- Beitar Tel Aviv
- Hapoel Jerusalem
- Beitar Jerusalem (youth)
- * Club domestic league appearances and goals

Danny Neuman (Hebrew: דני נוימן) is an Israeli sports commentator, formerly a soccer player and team manager.
