= 1992–93 Liga Leumit =

Liga Leumit
- Season: 1992–93
- Champions: Beitar Jerusalem; 2nd title
- Relegated: Beitar Tel Aviv
- Top goalscorer: Alon Mizrahi (26)

The 1992–93 Liga Leumit, Israeli national soccer league season ended with Beitar Jerusalem winning the championship after being promoted in the previous season from Liga Artzit.

== League standings ==
Pos	Team	Pld	W	D	L	GF	GA	GD	Pts	Qualification or relegation
1	Beitar Jerusalem (C)	33	22	5	6	64	38	+26	71	Qualification for the Champions League qualifying round Qualification for the Intertoto Cup group stage
2	Maccabi Tel Aviv	33	18	8	7	74	36	+38	62	Qualification for the Intertoto Cup group stage
3	Bnei Yehuda	33	17	5	11	66	57	+9	56	
4	Hapoel Be'er Sheva	33	15	9	9	52	36	+16	54	
5	Maccabi Haifa	33	12	11	10	55	46	+9	47	Qualification for the Cup Winners' Cup qualifying round
6	Hapoel Tzafririm Holon	33	13	5	15	49	49	0	44	
7	Hapoel Haifa	33	11	7	15	42	51	−9	40	
8	Maccabi Netanya	33	11	6	16	35	57	−22	39	
9	Hapoel Tel Aviv	33	10	8	15	52	64	−12	38	
10	Maccabi Petah Tikva	33	9	11	13	43	55	−12	38	
11	Hapoel Petah Tikva (O)	33	10	6	17	41	44	−3	36	Qualification for the relegation play-offs
12	Beitar Tel Aviv (R)	33	6	7	20	28	68	−40	25	Relegation to Liga Artzit

Source: rsssf.com
(C) Champions; (O) Play-off winners; (R) Relegated

== Results ==
=== First and second round ===
Home \ Away	BEI	BTA	BnY	HBS	HHA	HPT	HTA	MHA	MNE	MPT	MTA	TZH
Beitar Jerusalem	—	1–0	2–1	2–0	2–1	2–1	2–0	3–2	4–1	2–0	2–2	3–2
Beitar Tel Aviv	3–4	—	1–1	2–2	1–0	0–0	0–4	1–1	2–0	3–0	0–6	0–1
Bnei Yehuda	3–1	2–1	—	2–3	2–1	4–3	4–2	1–2	3–1	2–1	2–1	3–1
Hapoel Be'er Sheva	4–1	3–1	2–0	—	0–0	2–1	3–1	1–2	2–1	3–3	1–2	0–0
Hapoel Haifa	1–2	2–0	1–1	0–0	—	2–1	4–3	0–3	0–0	3–1	3–0	2–1
Hapoel Petah Tikva	0–0	0–2	3–2	0–1	0–1	—	1–2	0–2	3–0	1–1	2–3	1–0
Hapoel Tel Aviv	0–1	2–1	1–1	1–0	1–1	2–1	—	1–2	2–1	1–1	1–2	3–2
Maccabi Haifa	4–1	2–0	3–4	0–1	4–0	2–0	2–2	—	1–3	2–5	0–0	3–3
Maccabi Netanya	0–2	3–2	3–1	0–2	0–0	1–5	4–3	1–1	—	0–1	1–1	3–2
Maccabi Petah Tikva	0–0	1–1	1–2	1–1	1–0	0–0	2–2	1–1	6–0	—	3–1	3–1
Maccabi Tel Aviv	2–0	4–0	0–0	5–2	3–1	2–0	4–0	1–1	1–1	4–1	—	3–4
Tzafririm Holon	2–0	0–1	0–2	1–1	2–3	3–1	2–3	0–0	0–2	2–0	0–1	—

Legend: Blue = home team win; Yellow = draw; Red = away team win.

=== Third round ===
Home \ Away	BEI	BTA	BnY	HBS	HHA	HPT	HTA	MHA	MNE	MPT	MTA	TZH
Beitar Jerusalem	—	2–1	—	4–0	4–0	1–0	—	—	—	2–1	1–1	—
Beitar Tel Aviv	—	—	—	0–2	1–3	—	—	—	—	1–1	0–8	0–5
Bnei Yehuda	0–5	1–2	—	2–0	4–2	3–1	—	—	—	5–2	—	—
Hapoel Be'er Sheva	—	—	—	—	—	0–0	3–0	5–1	0–1	—	0–0	0–1
Hapoel Haifa	—	—	—	0–3	—	0–1	0–1	—	5–0	—	2–4	1–1
Hapoel Petah Tikva	—	1–0	—	—	—	—	2–1	—	2–1	5–0	—	3–1
Hapoel Tel Aviv	2–2	1–1	4–2	—	—	—	—	2–4	—	1–2	—	—
Maccabi Haifa	0–3	4–0	0–0	—	4–1	0–0	—	—	—	0–0	—	—
Maccabi Netanya	1–2	1–0	2–1	—	—	—	1–1	1–0	—	—	—	—
Maccabi Petah Tikva	—	—	—	0–4	0–2	—	—	—	1–0	—	2–1	1–2
Maccabi Tel Aviv	—	—	2–3	—	—	2–1	3–0	3–1	1–0	—	—	2–0
Tzafririm Holon	3–1	—	2–1	—	—	—	3–2	1–0	1–0	—	—	—

Legend: Blue = home team win; Yellow = draw; Red = away team win.

== Promotion-relegation play-off ==
A promotion-relegation play-off between the 13th-placed team in Liga Leumit, Hapoel Petah Tikva, and the 4th team in Liga Artzit, Maccabi Jaffa.

Maccabi Jaffa	0 – 3	Hapoel Petah Tikva

Gaon Stadium, Tel Aviv

Hapoel Petah Tikva	2 – 1	Maccabi Jaffa

Municipal Stadium, Petah Tikva

Hapoel Petah Tikva won 5–1 on aggregate and remained in Liga Leumit.
