= 1986–87 Liga Leumit =

Liga Leumit
- Season: 1986–87
- Champions: Beitar Jerusalem; 1st title
- Relegated: Maccabi Yavne; Maccabi Jaffa; Beitar Netanya
- Top goalscorer: Eli Yani (16)

The 1986–87 Liga Leumit season saw Beitar Jerusalem win their first title. Maccabi Yavne, Maccabi Jaffa and Beitar Netanya (in their first, and to date only season in the top division) were all relegated to Liga Artzit. Eli Yani of Hapoel Kfar Saba was the league's top scorer with 16 goals.

== Format changes ==
On 1 September 1986 the IFA board confirmed a proposal through which the number of teams in Liga Leumit would decrease to 14 teams. For this season three teams would relegate to Liga Artzit (as it was in previous seasons), and only one team would be promoted to Liga Leumit.

== Final table ==
Pos	Team	Pld	W	D	L	GF	GA	GD	Pts	Qualification or relegation
1	Beitar Jerusalem (C)	30	19	9	2	59	27	+32	66	Qualification for the Intertoto Cup
2	Bnei Yehuda	30	11	18	1	37	25	+12	51	Qualification for the Intertoto Cup
3	Maccabi Tel Aviv	30	12	11	7	43	25	+18	47	
4	Hapoel Lod	30	11	12	7	35	21	+14	45	
5	Shimshon Tel Aviv	30	10	15	5	33	20	+13	45	
6	Maccabi Petah Tikva	30	11	12	7	29	21	+8	45	
7	Maccabi Netanya	30	12	8	10	30	30	0	44	
8	Hapoel Kfar Saba	30	11	9	10	44	40	+4	42	
9	Maccabi Haifa	30	9	12	9	35	28	+7	39	
10	Hapoel Petah Tikva	30	9	11	10	31	30	+1	38	
11	Hapoel Be'er Sheva	30	7	15	8	20	19	+1	36	
12	Hapoel Tel Aviv	30	6	16	8	20	22	−2	34	
13	Beitar Tel Aviv	30	7	13	10	33	39	−6	34	
14	Maccabi Yavne (R)	30	6	12	12	28	35	−7	30	Relegated to Liga Artzit
15	Maccabi Jaffa (R)	30	4	10	16	23	48	−25	22	Relegated to Liga Artzit
16	Beitar Netanya (R)	30	3	1	26	22	92	−70	10	Relegated to Liga Artzit

Source: rsssf.com
(C) Champions; (R) Relegated

== Results ==
Home \ Away	BEI	BNT	BTA	BnY	HBS	HKS	HLD	HPT	HTA	MHA	MJA	MNE	MPT	MTA	MYV	STA
Beitar Jerusalem	—	6–0	1–1	2–2	1–0	3–2	0–0	4–1	0–0	2–1	3–0	2–0	0–2	2–1	0–0	1–1
Beitar Netanya	1–2	—	1–2	1–4	2–1	3–5	0–5	0–2	0–3	0–0	4–1	0–1	1–5	1–3	1–0	0–1
Beitar Tel Aviv	3–5	1–0	—	1–2	1–1	0–0	2–2	2–1	0–0	0–0	1–0	2–0	1–2	1–3	0–0	1–1
Bnei Yehuda	2–2	3–1	2–1	—	1–0	1–1	2–1	3–1	1–0	0–0	3–2	0–0	1–1	1–0	1–1	1–1
Hapoel Be'er Sheva	1–0	3–0	2–0	0–0	—	1–2	0–1	1–0	0–0	1–0	1–1	0–1	0–0	0–3	1–0	2–0
Hapoel Kfar Saba	2–3	4–1	2–3	0–0	0–0	—	2–2	2–1	0–0	2–1	1–1	2–0	2–0	2–0	2–0	2–2
Hapoel Lod	1–2	3–0	1–1	0–0	1–1	3–0	—	0–1	2–0	4–1	1–0	1–1	1–0	2–2	1–0	0–0
Hapoel Petah Tikva	0–3	3–0	1–1	1–1	0–0	1–0	0–0	—	0–0	1–1	0–0	2–1	1–0	0–0	1–0	0–1
Hapoel Tel Aviv	0–1	2–1	2–1	1–1	0–0	1–1	1–0	1–0	—	1–1	1–1	0–1	0–1	0–0	1–1	0–0
Maccabi Haifa	1–2	8–1	3–1	5–2	1–0	2–3	0–1	2–1	1–1	—	0–0	1–0	0–0	1–1	1–0	0–0
Maccabi Jaffa	1–4	2–1	1–1	0–1	0–0	2–1	1–2	1–1	3–2	0–1	—	1–1	1–1	0–2	1–3	0–3
Maccabi Netanya	3–4	1–0	1–1	1–1	1–1	2–0	1–0	0–4	3–1	1–0	2–0	—	0–1	1–1	2–0	2–0
Maccabi Petah Tikva	0–0	3–0	1–2	0–0	0–0	1–0	1–0	1–1	1–2	0–0	1–0	1–0	—	1–3	1–1	1–1
Maccabi Tel Aviv	0–2	7–1	2–1	1–1	1–1	1–2	0–0	0–0	1–0	2–1	3–0	2–0	0–1	—	2–0	1–1
Maccabi Yavne	0–1	6–1	1–1	0–0	1–1	2–1	2–0	2–5	0–0	1–1	2–1	1–1	3–2	1–1	—	0–2
Shimshon Tel Aviv	1–1	5–0	1–0	0–0	1–1	3–1	0–0	3–1	0–0	0–1	1–2	1–2	0–0	1–0	2–0	—

Legend: Blue = home team win; Yellow = draw; Red = away team win.
