= Bnei Yehuda Tel Aviv F.C. =

Israeli football club

Bnei Yehuda
- Full name: Bnei Yehuda Tel Aviv; Football Club
- Nicknames: The Neighbourhood; The Goldens; The Oranges
- Founded: 1936; 90 years ago
- Ground: Hatikva Neighborhood Stadium, Tel Aviv, Israel
- Capacity: 2,750
- Owner: Eliran Oved
- Chairman: Keren Sallem
- Manager: Eli Levi
- League: Liga Leumit
- 2025–26: Liga Leumit, 4th of 16
Home colours	Away colours	Third colours

Bnei Yehuda Tel Aviv F.C. (Hebrew: מועדון כדורגל בני יהודה תל אביב, Moadon Kaduregel Bnei Yehuda Tel Aviv), commonly referred to as Bnei Yehuda (בני יהודה), is an Israeli football club from the Hatikva Quarter of the city of Tel Aviv. The club is a member of the Liga Leumit. Founded in 1936, the team plays its home matches at the Hatikva Neighborhood Stadium.

== History ==
A chart showing the progress of Bnei Yehuda Tel Aviv through the Israeli football league system, from 1941–42 to the present

The club was formed in January 1936 by Yemenite religious Jews, With them Nathan Sulami and his friends. It was named after Judah (Hebrew: יהודה, Yehuda). Sulami and his friends were first promoted to the top division in 1959. Two seasons later they narrowly avoided relegation, finishing second from bottom. In 1965 the club reached the State Cup final for the first time, but lost 2–1 to Maccabi Tel Aviv. In 1968 they reached the final again, this time beating Hapoel Petah Tikva to claim their first piece of major silverware.

After several near-misses, the club was relegated at the end of the 1971–72 season after finishing second from bottom. However, they made an immediate return as Liga Alef champions but were relegated again in 1976. In the 1977–78 season the club were promoted back to the top division as Liga Artzit champions, and also reached the State Cup final, where they lost 2–1 to Maccabi Netanya. The following season the club finished fourth in Liga Leumit.

The 1980–81 season was the club's best so far. Managed by Shlomo Sharf they finished second in the league and reached the cup final again, this time beating Hapoel Tel Aviv 4–3 after a penalty shootout. However, the success was not maintained, and they were relegated at the end of the 1983–84 season.

The club made an immediate return as Liga Artzit champions and finished second in 1986–87. The 1989–90 season saw the club win its first, and to date only, championship under the leadership of Giora Spiegel. Two seasons later they won the Toto Cup for the first time, repeating the feat in 1997.

The 2000–01 season saw Bnei Yehuda finish second from bottom of the Premier League (which had replaced Liga Leumit as the top division) and the club was relegated. However, they made an immediate return as Liga Leumit runners-up. In 2005–06 they reached the cup final, losing 1–0 to Hapoel Tel Aviv, but also qualifying for Europe for the first time. In the 2006–07 UEFA Cup they lost 6–0 on aggregate to Lokomotiv Sofia and had to play their home match in Senec in Slovakia due to security concerns.

At the beginning of the 2006–07 season Abu Siam made the eyebrow-raising decision to sign with one of Mac TA's crosstown rivals, Bnei Yehuda Tel Aviv, a club with a fanatical fanbase smaller than Maccabi's, but more violent. Which is Bnei Yehuda. Although at the beginning of the season the fans ridiculed the decision to sign the club's first Arab player, the furor soon died down, which came to a surprise following similar affairs with Beitar Jerusalem that had occurred in 2005 and 2006 in regards to efforts to sign Muslim Nigerian player Ndala Ibrahim.

In the 2009–10 season Bnei Yehuda reached the European League play-off, after starting in the first qualifying round, but lost to PSV 2–0 on aggregate. The following season they reached the second qualifying round of the Europa League, but lost to Shamrock Rovers.

From 2009–10 to the 2012–13 season, Bnei Yehuda managed to finish regularly in the top 3–4 ranks of the Israeli Premier League which won her participation in the European League qualifying. Following the success, the group became a springboard for players. Many players who were remarkable in the ranks of Bnei Yehuda have moved or were sold to bigger clubs and others were called to the national team.

In the 2013–14 season, Bnei Yehuda finished bottom and relegated to Liga Leumit. However, they made an immediate return to the Premier League as the 2014–15 Liga Leumit champions.

In the 2016–17 season, the club won the National cup, and it was their first major title in 27 years (last one was the championship in 1989–90).

In 2017, HAP Investments became the Group's main sponsor. In June 2018 a new contract was signed for the 2018/2019 season.

== Fans ==
The Bnei Yehuda fanbase is predominantly a working-class neighbourhood support from Hatikva, and has one supporter group, the ultras "Lions Army", who express far-right political views. have been involved in various racist incidents, such as that involving Arab player Salim Tyameh and have developed a reputation for this as well as violence. The fans heavily criticised Ismaila Soro when he decided to move to Celtic F.C.

== Stadium ==
For most of its existence, Bnei Yehuda played at the Hatikva Neighborhood Stadium in the Hatikva Quarter of Tel Aviv. However, in 2004 the team moved their home matches to the Bloomfield Stadium, they returned to the old stadium in the 25/26 season

== European record ==
Season	Competition	Round	Opponent	Home	Away	Aggregate
2006–07	UEFA Cup	Q2	(Bulgaria) Lokomotiv Sofia	0–2	0–4	0–6
2009–10	Europa League	Q1	(Azerbaijan) Simurq PFC	3–0	1–0	4–0
2009–10	Europa League	Q2	(Latvia) Dinaburg Daugavpils	4–0	1–0	5–0
2009–10	Europa League	Q3	(Portugal) Paços Ferreira	1–0	1–0	2–0
2009–10	Europa League	PO	(Netherlands) PSV	0–1	0–1	0–2
2010–11	Europa League	Q1	(Armenia) Ulisses	1–0	0–0	1–0
2010–11	Europa League	Q2	(Republic of Ireland) Shamrock Rovers	0–1	1–1	1–2
2011–12	Europa League	Q2	(Andorra) UE Sant Julià	2–0	2–0	4–0
2011–12	Europa League	Q3	(Sweden) Helsingborgs IF	1–0	0–3	1–3
2012–13	Europa League	Q2	(Armenia) Shirak	2–0	1–0	3–0
2012–13	Europa League	Q3	(Greece) PAOK	0–2	1–4	1–6
2017–18	Europa League	Q2	(Slovakia) Trenčín	2–0	1–1	3–1
2017–18	Europa League	Q3	(Russia) Zenit Saint Petersburg	0–2	1–0	1–2
2019–20	Europa League	Q3	(Azerbaijan) Neftçi Baku	2–1	2–2	4–3
2019–20	Europa League	PO	(Sweden) Malmö	0–1	0–3	0–4

Notes

- Q1: First qualifying round
- Q2: Second qualifying round
- Q3: Third qualifying round
- PO: Play-off round

== Players ==
=== Current squad ===
As of 25 August 2026

No.	Pos.	Nation	Player
3	DF	ISR	Michael Pistiner
4	DF	ISR	Jonatan Agiyapong
5	DF	ISR	Matan Levi
7	FW	ISR	Dani Amer
8	MF	ISR	Golan Beni
9	FW	ISR	Stav Nachmani
10	MF	ISR	Sagi Dror
11	FW	ISR	Ben Hadadi
12	DF	ISR	Sahar Dabach
14	MF	NGA	Ofoeke Emmanuel
15	DF	ISR	Raz Nachmias
17	DF	ISR	Shahar Mizrahi

No.	Pos.	Nation	Player
18	FW	ISR	Noam Gissim
20	FW	BRA	Zé Flores
26	MF	ISR	Ori Hassan
27	FW	ISR	Sahar Hershkovitz
30	MF	ISR	Yuval Piven
33	GK	ISR	Or Yitzhak
55	MF	ISR	Nehoray Uzana
66	DF	GHA	Joel Nyrako
67	MF	ISR	Guy Sivilia
96	DF	ISR	Nir Bardea
98	GK	ISR	Tomer Litvinov

=== Loaned players ===
No.	Pos.	Nation	Player
—	FW	ISR	Nehoray Kariv (at Shimshon Tel Aviv until 30 June 2026)
—	DF	ISR	Tamir Haimovich (at Hapoel Jerusalem F.C. until 30 June 2026)

== Titles ==
=== League ===
Title	No.	Years
Israeli Championships	1	1989–90

=== Cup competitions ===
Title	No.	Years
State Cup	4	1967–68, 1980–81, 2016–17, 2018–19
Toto Cup	2	1991–92, 1996–97
Super cup	1	1990

== Managers ==
- Emmanuel Scheffer (1962–63)
- Israel Halivner (1964)
- Ze'ev Seltzer (1978–80)
- Shlomo Scharf (1980–83)
- Giora Spiegel (1989–92)
- Yehoshua Feigenbaum (1997–98)
- Giora Spiegel (1999–00)
- Eli Ohana (2000–01), (2001–03)
- Nitzan Shirazi (2005–08)
- Eli Cohen (born 1951) (21 January 2008 – 30 March 2008)
- Hezi Shirazi (30 March 2008 – 30 June 2008)
- Guy Luzon (1 July 2008 – 31 May 2010)
- Dror Kashtan (1 July 2010 – 4 June 2011)
- Yossi Abukasis (14 June 2011 – 13 May 2012)
- Dror Kashtan (13 May 2012 – 9 December 2013)
- Yossi Abukasis (9 December 2013–16)
- Yossi Mizrahi (2016)
- Arik Benado (2016)
- Nissan Yehezkel (2016–2017)
- Yossi Abukasis (2017–2020)
- Elisha Levy (2020–present)

== See also ==
- History of Tel Aviv
- Hatikva quarter of Tel Aviv
