= 1985 Israel Super Cup =

Maccabi Haifa	Beitar Jerusalem
5	2
- Date: 8 June 1985
- Venue: Kiryat Haim Stadium, Haifa
- Referee: Moshe Ashkenazi
- Attendance: 7,000

The 1985 Israel Super Cup was the 15th Israel Super Cup (20th, including unofficial matches, as the competition wasn't played within the Israel Football Association in its first 5 editions, until 1969), an annual Israel football match played between the winners of the previous season's Top Division and Israel State Cup.

The match was played between Maccabi Haifa, champions of the 1984–85 Liga Leumit and Beitar Jerusalem, winners of the 1984–85 Israel State Cup.

This was Maccabi Haifa's 3rd Israel Super Cup appearance (including unofficial matches) and Beitar's 4th. At the match, played at Kiryat Haim Stadium, Maccabi Haifa won 5–2.

== Match details ==
8 June 1985
17:00

Maccabi Haifa	5–2	Beitar Jerusalem
Armeli 3', 24'; Merili 20', 75'; Malka 45'		Malmilian 41', 66'

Kiryat Haim Stadium, Haifa
Attendance: 7,000
Referee: Moshe Ashkenazi

Maccabi Haifa	Beitar Jerusalem

GK	(Israel) Avi Ran
RB	(Israel) Eitan Aharoni
CB	(Israel) Rafi Osmo (The Large)	Substituted off
CB	(Israel) Nir Klinger
LB	(Israel) Zion Merili
DM	(Israel) Avraham Abukarat (c)
CM	(Israel) Yaron Givol
CM	(Israel) Rafi Osmo (The Small)
FW	(Israel) Ronny Rosenthal
FW	(Israel) Zahi Armeli
FW	(Israel) Zadok Malka
Substitutes:
DF	(Israel) Yossi Kramer	Substituted in
MF	(Israel) Shalom Levi
Manager:
(Israel) Shlomo Sharf

GK	(Israel) Yossi Mizrahi
RB	(Israel) Shlomo Shirzai
DF	(Israel) Hanan Azulay (c)
DF	(Israel) Udi Ashash
LB	(Israel) David Azulay
RM	(Israel) Moshe Ben Harush
LM	(Israel) Meir Kadosh
CM	(Israel) Sammy Malka
CM	(Israel) Uri Malmilian
FW	(Israel) Eli Ohana
FW	(Israel) Avi Golder	Substituted off
Substitutes:
MF	(Israel) Ya'akov Schwartz	Substituted in
Manager:
(Israel) David Schweitzer
