= Sammy Malka =

Israeli footballer (born 1963)

Sammy Malka סמי מלכה
Personal information
- Full name: Sammy Malka
- Date of birth: July 4, 1963 (age 63)
- Place of birth: Jerusalem, Israel
- Height: 1.69 m (5 ft 6 1/2 in)
- Position: Midfielder

Youth career
- Beitar Jerusalem

Senior career*
Years	Team	Apps	(Gls)
1979–1992	Beitar Jerusalem	288	(47)
1981–1983	→ Hapoel Be'er Sheva		
1992	Hapoel Ashkelon		
1992–1993	Sektzia Ness Ziona		
1993–1994	Beitar Lod		
- * Club domestic league appearances and goals

Sammy Malka (Hebrew: סמי מלכה; born 4 July 1963) is a former Israeli soccer player.

== Career ==
Malka born in Jerusalem the Moroccan-Jewish family who made aliyah two years before from Rabat the capital of Morocco. Malka started his career at Beitar Jerusalem's youth team, along with Eli Ohana, Avi Cohen, Udi Ashash and Moshe Ben Arush. Help the club to promote back to the Israeli First Division, but loaned to Hapoel Be'er Sheva for two seasons as a part of Uri Benjamin's sale deal that made the opposite way.

Whilst on the team, Beitar won the Israel State Cup twice during the seasons 1984–85 & 1985–86. Won with Beitar the first championship with 14 goals included the Championship goal against Maccabi Tel Aviv.

== Honors ==
Beitar Jerusalem

- Israel championship: 1986–87
- Israel State Cup: 1984–85, 1985–86, 1988–89
- Israel Super Cup: 1986
