= Udi Ashash =

Israeli association football player

Udi Ashash אודי אשש
Personal information
- Full name: Ehud Ashash
- Date of birth: March 22, 1963 (age 63)
- Place of birth: Jerusalem, Israel
- Height: 1.83 m (6 ft 0 in)
- Position: Center back

Youth career
- Beitar Jerusalem

Senior career*
| Years | Team | Apps | (Gls) |
| 1982–1991 | Beitar Jerusalem | 214 | (1) |
- * Club domestic league appearances and goals

Ehud "Udi" Ashash (Hebrew: אהוד "אודי" אשש; born March 22, 1963) is an Israeli former football player.

== Career ==
Ashash started his career at Beitar Jerusalem playing as a defender (centre-back).

In 1982, he joined the senior team of Beitar along with Eli Ohana, Avi Cohen, Sammy Malka and Moshe Ben Arush. Ashash served as the team's captain for a short period during the 1980s.

Whilst on the team, Beitar won the Israel State Cup twice during the seasons 1984–85 and 1985–86.

In January 1991, Ashash retired from football due to a spinal disc herniation.

After his retirement he became a Yeshiva student.

In 2019, Ashash was added to Beitar Jerusalem's Hall of Fame.

== Honors ==
Beitar Jerusalem

- Israel championship: 1986–87, 1996–97, 1997–98
- Israel State Cup: 1984–85, 1985–86, 1988–89
- Israel Super Cup: 1986
