= Meir Kadosh =

Israeli footballer

Meir Kadosh מאיר קדוש
Personal information
- Full name: Meir Kadosh
- Date of birth: November 25, 1965 (age 60)
- Place of birth: Jerusalem, Israel
- Positions: Centre back; midfielder

Youth career
- Beitar Jerusalem

Senior career*
Years	Team	Apps	(Gls)
1984–1995	Beitar Jerusalem	279	(0)
- * Club domestic league appearances and goals

Meir Kadosh (Hebrew: מאיר קדוש; born 25 November 1965) is a former Israeli footballer. Played 11 season for Beitar Jerusalem until his retirement.

== Career ==
Kadosh started to play football in Beitar Jerusalem. On the 19th fixture of 1984–85 against Maccabi Haifa Kadosh passed back to the goalkeeper Yossi Mizrahi but the ball got stuck in puddle and Avraham Abukarat scored for Haifa.

Today Kadosh has car lot in Jerusalem.

== Honours ==
- Israeli Championships
  - Winner (2): 1986–87, 1992–93
  - Runner-up (2): 1984–85
- State Cup
  - Winner (3): 1984–85, 1985–86, 1988–89
- Israeli Supercup
  - Winner (1): 1986
- Lilian Cup
  - Winner (1): 1985
