= 1983 Lilian Cup =

1983 League Cup

Tournament details
- Country: Israel
- Dates: 3–13 September 1983
- Teams: 4

Final positions
- Champions: Maccabi Netanya
- Runner-up: Hapoel Be'er Sheva

Tournament statistics
- Matches played: 8
- Goals scored: 25 (3.13 per match)
- Top goal scorer(s): 8 players (2)

The 1983 Lilian Cup was the 2nd season of the competition. The four top placed teams for the previous season took part in the competition.

The competition was held in two stages. First, the four teams played a round-robin tournament, after which the two top teams played for the cup, while the bottom teams played for the third place. The competition was held between 3 September and 13 September 1983.

The competition was won by Maccabi Netanya, who had beaten Hapoel Be'er Sheva 3–2 in the final.

== Group stage ==
The matches were played from 3 September to 10 September 1983.

Pos	Team	Pld	W	D	L	GF	GA	GD	Pts	Qualification
1	Maccabi Netanya	3	2	0	1	8	3	+5	6	Advance to the final
2	Hapoel Be'er Sheva	3	1	1	1	3	3	0	4	Advance to the final
3	Shimshon Tel Aviv	3	1	1	1	4	7	−3	4	3rd-4th place playoff
4	Hapoel Tel Aviv	3	1	0	2	2	3	−1	3	3rd-4th place playoff

Rules for classification: 1st points; 2nd goal difference; 3rd matches won; 4th goals scored; 5th head-to-head; 6th decision match

3 September 1983 Round 1	Maccabi Netanya	5–1	Shimshon Tel Aviv	Netanya
	Menahem 41', 42'; Pizanti 44'; Lam 69'; Etzioni 88'	Report (p. 2) (in Hebrew)	Damti 38'	Stadium: HaKufsa; Attendance: 1500; Referee: Yosef Diamant

3 September 1983 Round 1	Hapoel Be'er Sheva	0–1	Hapoel Tel Aviv	Be'er Sheva
		Report (p. 2) (in Hebrew)	Zano 54'	Stadium: Vasermil Stadium; Attendance: 2000; Referee: Ya'akov Scheiner

6 September 1983 Round 2	Hapoel Be'er Sheva	2–1	Maccabi Netanya	Be'er Sheva
	Davidi 49'; Avitan 75'	Report (p. 18) (in Hebrew)	Machnes 17'	Stadium: Vassermil Stadium; Attendance: 1200; Referee: Gabi Levy

6 September 1983 Round 2	Hapoel Tel Aviv	1–2	Shimshon Tel Aviv	Tel Aviv
	Zano 89'	Report (p. 18) (in Hebrew)	Atiya 39'; Arbiv 67'	Stadium: Bloomfield Stadium; Attendance: 700; Referee: Ovadia Zvi

10 September 1983 Round 3	Shimshon Tel Aviv	1–1	Hapoel Be'er Sheva	Netanya
	Damti 38'	Report (p. 2) (in Hebrew)	Uzan 45'	Stadium: HaKufsa; Attendance: 3500; Referee: Itzhak Rosenberg

10 September 1983 Round 3	Maccabi Netanya	2–0	Hapoel Tel Aviv	Netanya
	Machnes 55'; Pizanti 72'	Report (p. 2) (in Hebrew)		Stadium: HaKufsa; Attendance: 5000; Referee: Moshe Ashkenazi

== Final stage ==
=== 3rd-4th Place Match ===
13 September 1983

Shimshon Tel Aviv	1–2	Hapoel Tel Aviv
E. Cohen 79'	Report (p. 2) (in Hebrew)	S. Levi 71'; Dov Remler 85'

Bloomfield Stadium
Attendance: 2000
Referee: Itzhak Ben Itzhak

=== Final ===
13 September 1983

Maccabi Netanya	3–2	Hapoel Be'er Sheva
Lam 2'; Gariani 52', 76'	Report (p. 2) (in Hebrew)	Herzl Fitusi 21', 34'

Bloomfield Stadium
Attendance: 3500
Referee: Yair Tilinger
