= List of Israeli top-flight league players with 100 or more goals =

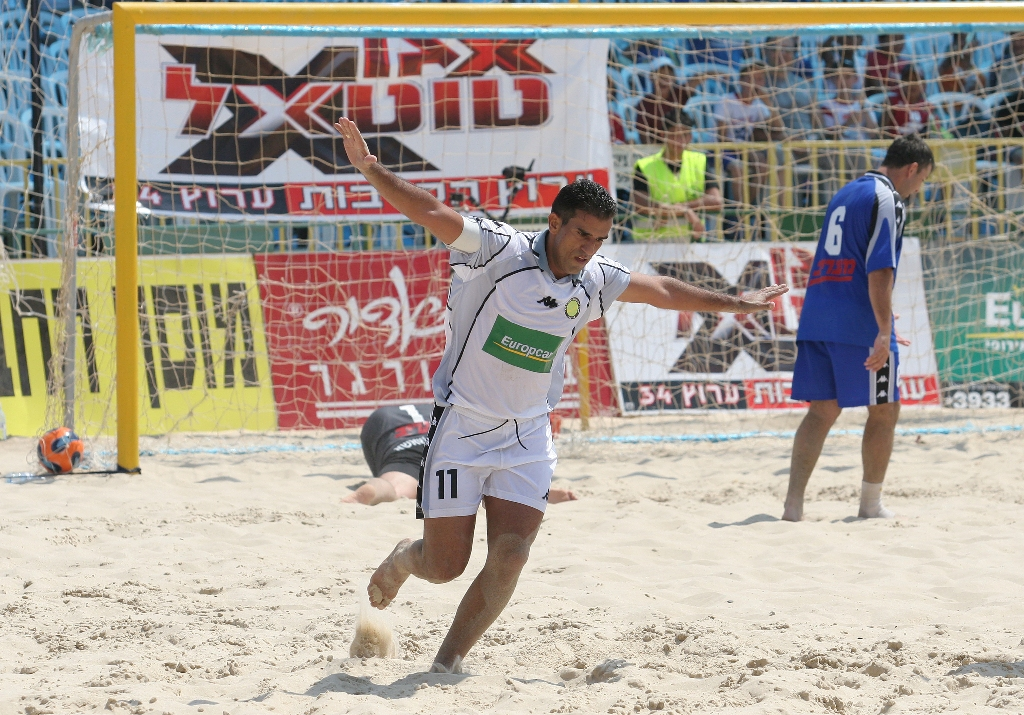
Alon Mizrahi is the only player to score more than 200 league goals.

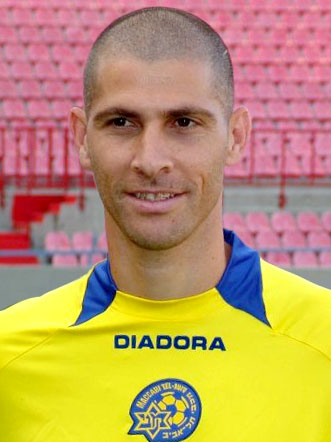
Avi Nimni is the league's highest scoring midfielder of all time.

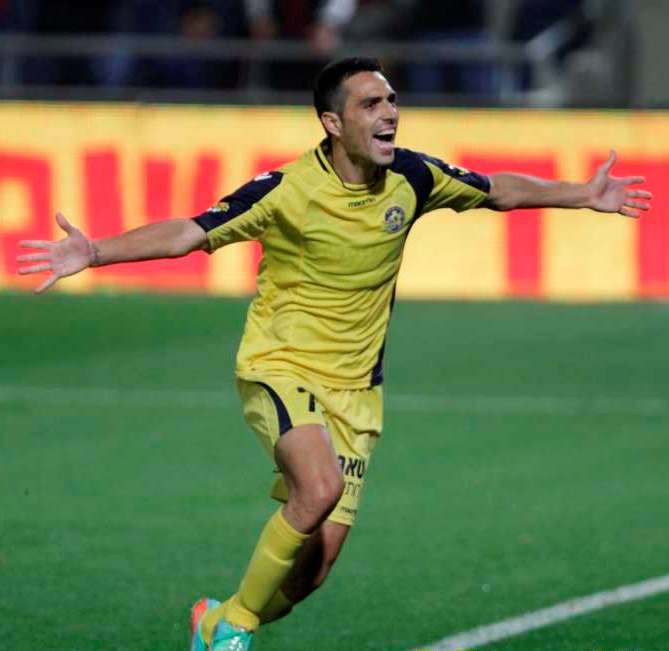
Eran Zahavi is the only active player to score more than 100 league goals.

Since the israeli top-flight league's formation at the start of the 1931–32 season, 35 players have managed to accrue 100 or more goals in the league.

Nahum Stelmach holds the record for the fewest games taken to reach 100, doing so in 138 appearances.

== Players ==
As of 4 August 2025

List of israeli top-flight league players with 100 or more goals
Rank	Player	Club(s)	Goals
1	(Israel) Alon Mizrahi	Bnei Yehuda, Hapoel Tel Aviv, Maccabi Haifa, Maccabi Tel Aviv, Maccabi Ashdod, Beitar Jerusalem, Hapoel Kfar Saba, Ahi Nazareth, Hapoel Be'er Sheva	206
2	(Israel) Oded Machnes	Maccabi Netanya, Maccabi Petah Tikva, Maccabi Tel Aviv, Hapoel Tiberias	196
3	(Israel) Moshe Romano	Shimshon Tel Aviv, Beitar Tel Aviv, Hapoel Yehud	193
4	(Israel) Avi Nimni	Maccabi Tel Aviv, Beitar Jerusalem	192
5	(Israel) **Eran Zahavi**	Hapoel Tel Aviv, Maccabi Tel Aviv	177
6	(Israel) Shay Holtzman	Maccabi Netanya, Maccabi Haifa, Tzafririm Holon, Hapoel Be'er Sheva, Beitar Jerusalem, Hapoel Haifa, Maccabi Petah Tikva, Hapoel Rishon LeZion, Ironi Ashdod	169
7	(Israel) Mordechai Spiegler	Maccabi Netanya, Hapoel Haifa, Beitar Tel Aviv	168
8	(Israel) Uri Malmilian	Beitar Jerusalem, Maccabi Tel Aviv, Hapoel Be'er Sheva	159
9	(Israel) David Lavi	Maccabi Netanya, Beitar Tel Aviv	158
10	(Israel) Nahum Stelmach	Hapoel Petah Tikva, Bnei Yehuda	155
11	(Israel) Yehoshua Feigenbaum	Hapoel Tel Aviv, Shimshon Tel Aviv, Hapoel Jerusalem, Hapoel Ramat Gan	147
12	(Israel) Gidi Damti	Shimshon Tel Aviv	142
13	(Israel) Itzik Zohar	Maccabi Tel Aviv, Beitar Jerusalem, Maccabi Haifa, Maccabi Herzliya, Maccabi Netanya, Ironi Ashdod, Hapoel Nazareth Illit	141
14	(Israel) Eliran Atar	Bnei Yehuda, Maccabi Tel Aviv, Maccabi Haifa, Beitar Jerusalem	137
15	(Israel) Yehoshua Glazer	Maccabi Tel Aviv, Sektzia Nes Tziona	136
16	(Israel) Motti Kakoun	Hapoel Petah Tikva	134
17	(Israel) Yehuda Shaharabani	Hakoah Ramat Gan, Hapoel Petah Tikva, Beitar Tel Aviv	131
18	(Israel) Eli Driks	Maccabi Tel Aviv, Maccabi Yavne, Maccabi Netanya, Maccabi Herzliya	128
18	(Israel) Benny Tabak	Maccabi Tel Aviv, Maccabi Petah Tikva	128
20	(Israel) Amir Turjeman	Maccabi Tel Aviv, Maccabi Ashdod, Hapoel Haifa, Maccabi Haifa, Beitar Jerusalem, Ironi Ashdod	125
21	(Israel) Reuven Atar	Maccabi Haifa, Hapoel Haifa, Beitar Jerusalem, Hapoel Petah Tikva, Maccabi Netanya	123
21	Israel Fogel	Hapoel Kfar Saba, Beitar Netanya	123
23	(Israel) Victor Sarusi	Maccabi Netanya, Beitar Jerusalem, Hapoel Be'er Sheva	122
24	(Israel) Eli Ohana	Beitar Jerusalem	121
25	(Israel) Boaz Kofman	Hapoel Petah Tikva, Beitar Tel Aviv	119
26	(Israel) Shalom Avitan	Hapoel Be'er Sheva, Beitar Jerusalem, Hapoel Jerusalem, Hapoel Tel Aviv	118
27	(Israel) Zahi Armeli	Maccabi Haifa, Hapoel Jerusalem, Tzafririm Holon, Hapoel Haifa	114
27	(Israel) Moshe Onana	Maccabi Jaffa, Bnei Yehuda, Hakoah Ramat Gan	114
29	(Israel) Eli Ben Rimoz	Hapoel Jerusalem	106
29	(Israel) Shlomo Levi	Maccabi Haifa, Hapoel Haifa, Hapoel Ramat Gan	106
29	(Israel) Zecharia Ratzabi	Hapoel Petah Tikva, Hapoel Mahane Yehuda	106
32	(Israel) Hezi Shirazi	Bnei Yehuda, Hapoel Tel Aviv, Tzafririm Holon, Maccabi Haifa	105
33	(Israel) Kobi Refua	Maccabi Tel Aviv, Hapoel Kfar Saba, Bnei Yehuda, Maccabi Petah Tikva	103
33	(Israel) Assi Tubi	Shimshon Tel Aviv, Tzafririm Holon, Hapoel Kfar Saba, Hapoel Jerusalem, Hapoel Tel Aviv, Maccabi Petah Tikva, Maccabi Ahi Nazareth	103
35	(Israel) Moshe Sinai	Maccabi Jaffa, Hapoel Tel Aviv, Bnei Yehuda	102
36	(Israel) Giora Spiegel	Maccabi Tel Aviv, Hakoah Ramat Gan, Beitar Tel Aviv	101
37	(Israel) Itay Shechter	Hapoel Nazareth Illit, Maccabi Netanya, Hapoel Tel Aviv, Maccabi Haifa, Beitar Jerusalem, Maccabi Tel Aviv, Hapoel Be'er Sheva, Hapoel Petah Tikva	100
(Italics denotes players still playing professional football; **Bold** denotes players still playing in the league)
