= 1978–79 Liga Leumit =

Liga Leumit
- Season: 1978–79
- Champions: Maccabi Tel Aviv; 14th title
- Relegated: Hapoel Hadera; Hapoel Jerusalem; Hapoel Rishon LeZion
- Top goalscorer: Oded Machnes; Eli Miali (18)

The 1978–79 Liga Leumit season saw Maccabi Tel Aviv win the title, whilst Hapoel Hadera, Hapoel Jerusalem and Hapoel Rishon LeZion (in their first season back in the top division since 1952) were relegated to Liga Artzit. Oded Machnes (Maccabi Netanya) and Eli Miali (Beitar Jerusalem) were the league's joint top scorers with 18 goals.

== Final table ==
Pos	Team	Pld	W	D	L	GF	GA	GD	Pts	Qualification or relegation
1	Maccabi Tel Aviv (C)	30	18	8	4	47	16	+31	44	
2	Beitar Jerusalem	30	14	12	4	50	23	+27	40	
3	Maccabi Netanya	30	12	12	6	47	33	+14	36	Qualification for the Intertoto Cup
4	Bnei Yehuda	30	8	17	5	28	21	+7	33	
5	Hapoel Haifa	30	9	13	8	27	24	+3	31	
6	Hapoel Tel Aviv	30	9	13	8	27	30	−3	31	
7	Maccabi Jaffa	30	12	7	11	38	42	−4	31	
8	Hapoel Yehud	30	8	13	9	25	25	0	29	
9	Hapoel Be'er Sheva	30	9	11	10	31	33	−2	29	
10	Hapoel Kfar Saba	30	9	11	10	38	41	−3	29	
11	Beitar Tel Aviv	30	8	11	11	30	30	0	27	
12	Shimshon Tel Aviv	30	8	11	11	30	35	−5	27	
13	Maccabi Petah Tikva	30	8	11	11	25	46	−21	27	
14	Hapoel Hadera (R)	30	10	5	15	35	44	−9	25	Relegated to Liga Artzit
15	Hapoel Jerusalem (R)	30	5	13	12	18	26	−8	23	Relegated to Liga Artzit
16	Hapoel Rishon LeZion (Note: Two points deducted) (R)	30	4	10	16	19	46	−27	16	Relegated to Liga Artzit

Source: rsssf.com
(C) Champions; (R) Relegated

== Results ==
Home \ Away	BEI	BTA	BnY	HBS	HAH	HHA	HJE	HKS	HRL	HTA	HYE	MJA	MNE	MPT	MTA	STA
Beitar Jerusalem	—	2–0	1–1	4–0	4–1	1–0	1–1	2–1	3–0	0–1	2–1	3–0	1–1	3–0	0–1	3–1
Beitar Tel Aviv	0–3	—	0–0	2–0	1–2	0–2	1–1	1–2	3–0	0–0	3–2	4–0	2–0	2–0	0–3	1–1
Bnei Yehuda	1–1	1–1	—	1–0	1–0	2–0	2–1	0–0	0–0	1–1	1–0	1–0	0–0	0–1	1–1	1–2
Hapoel Be'er Sheva	1–1	3–1	1–0	—	0–4	2–0	0–0	2–1	1–1	1–1	0–1	4–1	0–1	3–1	1–0	0–0
Hapoel Hadera	1–0	0–0	0–2	1–5	—	0–1	1–0	3–0	3–1	0–0	1–1	4–1	1–4	4–2	1–3	3–1
Hapoel Haifa	1–1	1–0	1–1	0–0	2–0	—	0–1	0–0	0–0	0–0	1–1	0–0	2–1	4–0	0–1	2–0
Hapoel Jerusalem	0–0	0–0	1–1	1–0	1–2	0–1	—	2–2	0–0	1–1	0–3	2–0	1–1	0–1	0–1	1–0
Hapoel Kfar Saba	0–3	2–2	1–1	4–1	2–0	2–2	1–0	—	4–1	0–1	0–0	1–2	1–3	0–1	1–1	1–1
Hapoel Rishon LeZion	1–2	0–0	1–1	1–2	2–0	0–1	1–0	0–1	—	1–1	2–0	1–5	1–1	0–1	0–5	2–2
Hapoel Tel Aviv	1–1	0–3	1–1	1–1	2–2	3–1	0–2	2–0	3–0	—	2–0	0–3	2–1	0–0	1–1	0–2
Hapoel Yehud	4–2	0–0	1–0	1–1	0–0	0–0	0–0	1–2	1–0	1–0	—	1–0	0–0	1–2	1–0	0–1
Maccabi Jaffa	1–1	1–0	0–0	1–1	1–0	3–2	0–0	2–3	1–2	3–0	0–0	—	2–1	2–0	4–3	0–0
Maccabi Netanya	1–1	2–2	2–1	1–0	3–1	1–1	1–0	2–2	2–0	0–1	3–3	2–0	—	6–2	0–0	2–1
Maccabi Petah Tikva	0–0	1–0	1–1	1–0	1–0	1–1	2–1	1–3	2–1	0–1	0–0	1–2	3–3	—	0–1	0–4
Maccabi Tel Aviv	1–1	1–0	1–4	0–0	2–0	2–0	2–0	3–0	0–0	2–0	1–1	3–0	1–0	3–0	—	3–0
Shimshon Tel Aviv	1–3	0–1	1–1	1–1	1–0	1–1	1–1	1–1	1–0	2–1	1–0	2–3	1–2	0–0	0–1	—

Legend: Blue = home team win; Yellow = draw; Red = away team win.
