= 1974–75 Liga Leumit =

Liga Leumit
- Season: 1974–75
- Champions: Hapoel Be'er Sheva; 1st title
- Top goalscorer: Moshe Romano (17)

The 1974–75 Liga Leumit season saw Hapoel Be'er Sheva win their first ever title. Moshe Romano of Beitar Tel Aviv was the league's top scorer with 17 goals.

Although two clubs were due to be relegated, they were eventually reprieved after the Israel Football Association decided to expand the league to 18 clubs for the following season.

== Final table ==
Pos	Team	Pld	W	D	L	GF	GA	GD	Pts	Qualification
1	Hapoel Be'er Sheva	30	15	10	5	34	19	+15	40	Champions
2	Maccabi Netanya	30	14	9	7	39	29	+10	37	
3	Hapoel Haifa	30	12	11	7	38	26	+12	35	
4	Maccabi Tel Aviv	30	14	7	9	26	19	+7	35	
5	Hapoel Jerusalem	30	14	5	11	30	25	+5	33	
6	Shimshon Tel Aviv	30	12	7	11	32	25	+7	31	
7	Hapoel Hadera	30	9	13	8	30	26	+4	31	
8	Hapoel Tel Aviv	30	10	9	11	23	23	0	29	
9	Hapoel Petah Tikva	30	11	7	12	32	33	−1	29	
10	Hapoel Kfar Saba	30	9	11	10	30	34	−4	29	
11	Bnei Yehuda	30	9	10	11	27	29	−2	28	
12	Beitar Tel Aviv	30	9	10	11	33	36	−3	28	
13	Maccabi Jaffa	30	11	6	13	28	34	−6	28	
14	Hakoah Ramat Gan	30	8	12	10	26	33	−7	28	
15	Beitar Jerusalem	30	9	8	13	23	27	−4	26	Reprieved from relegation
16	Maccabi Petah Tikva	30	2	9	19	12	45	−33	13	Reprieved from relegation

Source: rsssf.com

== Results ==
Home \ Away	BEI	BTA	BnY	HAR	HBS	HAH	HHA	HJE	HKS	HPT	HTA	MJA	MNE	MPT	MTA	STA
Beitar Jerusalem	—	1–2	1–1	1–2	1–0	1–1	1–1	0–1	1–0	2–0	0–2	1–0	0–1	1–0	2–1	0–0
Beitar Tel Aviv	1–1	—	1–5	4–1	1–1	0–0	0–3	1–0	0–1	1–2	1–0	1–1	2–2	0–0	1–1	0–1
Bnei Yehuda	0–0	2–1	—	1–2	1–2	0–3	1–1	1–0	2–0	2–1	0–0	0–1	1–0	1–1	0–1	2–0
Hakoah Ramat Gan	1–0	2–1	0–0	—	1–2	2–1	0–3	1–1	1–1	2–0	0–1	0–1	1–0	2–2	1–1	0–0
Hapoel Be'er Sheva	1–0	2–0	0–0	2–1	—	0–0	2–1	1–2	1–0	0–0	2–0	1–0	1–0	1–0	0–1	0–0
Hapoel Hadera	0–0	1–0	1–0	1–1	3–3	—	0–0	1–0	0–0	1–0	1–0	2–2	1–3	3–0	0–0	1–0
Hapoel Haifa	1–0	2–0	1–0	2–0	0–1	1–1	—	0–0	2–0	3–2	1–1	1–0	3–1	4–1	0–0	0–0
Hapoel Jerusalem	0–1	0–1	0–0	2–0	2–1	1–1	1–0	—	2–0	1–0	0–3	3–2	0–1	2–0	0–3	1–2
Hapoel Kfar Saba	3–1	2–2	1–0	0–0	3–3	3–1	1–1	1–2	—	1–3	0–0	1–2	2–2	1–0	2–1	2–0
Hapoel Petah Tikva	1–1	0–3	2–0	1–1	0–0	1–0	2–1	0–0	1–2	—	0–0	4–1	3–0	2–0	1–2	1–2
Hapoel Tel Aviv	2–1	1–0	4–2	0–0	0–3	1–0	0–0	0–2	0–0	4–0	—	0–1	0–0	0–0	1–0	1–0
Maccabi Jaffa	1–0	0–2	0–0	2–0	0–2	1–1	3–2	0–2	2–0	1–2	1–0	—	1–1	2–0	1–0	0–2
Maccabi Netanya	3–1	0–0	1–1	0–0	0–0	3–2	2–1	2–1	2–0	0–1	4–2	4–2	—	2–0	1–0	1–0
Maccabi Petah Tikva	0–3	1–3	1–3	1–1	0–1	0–3	0–2	0–1	1–1	1–1	1–0	1–0	0–0	—	0–1	0–0
Maccabi Tel Aviv	1–0	1–2	0–1	1–0	1–0	1–0	1–1	0–2	0–0	1–0	2–0	0–0	2–1	1–0	—	1–2
Shimshon Tel Aviv	0–1	2–2	3–0	1–3	1–1	2–0	5–0	2–1	1–2	0–1	1–0	1–0	1–2	3–1	0–1	—

Legend: Blue = home team win; Yellow = draw; Red = away team win.
