= Hanan Azulay =

Israeli footballer

Hanan Azulay חנן אזולאי
Personal information
- Full name: Hanan Azulay
- Date of birth: March 23, 1958 (age 68)
- Place of birth: Jerusalem, Israel
- Positions: Centre back; midfielder

Youth career
- Beitar Jerusalem

Senior career*
Years	Team	Apps	(Gls)
1975–1990	Beitar Jerusalem	396	(41)

International career
1984–1986	Israel	5	(0)

Managerial career
- 1997–2000: Hapoel Beit She'an (youth)
- 2000–2001: Beitar Jerusalem (youth)
- 2003: Beitar Jerusalem (caretaker)
- 2006–2008: Israel U16
- 2012: Beitar Jerusalem (caretaker)
- 2017–2018: Hapoel Bik'at HaYarden
- 2020–: Hapoel Bik'at HaYarden
- * Club domestic league appearances and goals

Hanan Azulay (Hebrew: חנן אזולאי; born 23 March 1958) is a former Israeli footballer. Played 15 season for Beitar Jerusalem until his retirement.

Azulay had 396 caps for Beitar. He ranks second on Beitar Jerusalem's all-time appearances list, only Uri Malmilian having more appearances more.

== Career ==
Azulay started to play football in Beitar Jerusalem. In 1975, he signed for the senior team and won with the club in the 1975–76 Israel State Cup. In 1982, he was appointed the captain of the club.

In 1990, he announced his retirement after anterior cruciate ligament injury.

== Honours ==
- Israeli Championships
  - Winner (1): 1986–87
- State Cup
  - Winner (3): 1984–85, 1985–86, 1988–89
- Israeli Supercup
  - Winner (1): 1976, 1986
