= 1986–87 Toto Cup Leumit =

Toto Cup Leumit
- Season: 1986–87
- Champions: Shimshon Tel Aviv

The 1986–87 Toto Cup Leumit was the third season of the third most important football tournament in Israel since its introduction.

It was held in two stages. First, the 16 Liga Leumit teams were divided into four groups. The group winners advanced to the semi-finals, which, as was the final, were held as one-legged matches.

The competition was won by Shimshon Tel Aviv, who had beaten Maccabi Netanya 2–0 in the final.

== Group stage ==
=== Group A ===
Pos	Team	Pld	W	D	L	GF	GA	GD	Pts	MNE	HTA	BnY	HPT
1	Maccabi Netanya (A)	6	4	1	1	7	4	+3	13	—	2–1	1–2	1–0
2	Hapoel Tel Aviv	6	2	3	1	7	4	+3	9	0–0	—	1–1	2–0
3	Bnei Yehuda	6	2	2	2	7	8	−1	8	0–1	0–2	—	3–2
4	Hapoel Petah Tikva	6	0	2	4	5	10	−5	2	1–2	1–1	1–1	—

Source: Toto Cup Leumit 1985-86 (in Hebrew)
Rules for classification: 1st points; 2nd goal difference; 3rd matches won; 4th goals scored; 5th head-to-head; 6th decision match
(A) Advanced to semifinal

=== Group B ===
Pos	Team	Pld	W	D	L	GF	GA	GD	Pts	STA	HKS	MHA	BNT
1	Shimshon Tel Aviv (A)	6	5	0	1	11	4	+7	15	—	3–0	1–0	3–2
2	Hapoel Kfar Saba	6	3	1	2	10	5	+5	10	0–1	—	1–0	6–1
3	Maccabi Haifa	6	3	0	3	12	8	+4	9	1–0	0–3	—	8–1
4	Beitar Netanya	6	0	1	5	7	23	−16	1	1–3	0–0	2–3	—

Source: Toto Cup Leumit 1985-86 (in Hebrew)
Rules for classification: 1st points; 2nd goal difference; 3rd matches won; 4th goals scored; 5th head-to-head; 6th decision match
(A) Advanced to semifinal

=== Group C ===
Pos	Team	Pld	W	D	L	GF	GA	GD	Pts	MTA	MYA	MPT	BTA
1	Maccabi Tel Aviv (A)	6	3	2	1	11	8	+3	11	—	3–2	2–0	2–1
2	Maccabi Yavne	6	2	2	2	10	10	0	8	2–2	—	2–0	1–1
3	Maccabi Petah Tikva	6	2	1	3	3	8	−5	7	2–1	0–3	—	0–0
4	Beitar Tel Aviv	6	1	3	2	7	5	+2	6	1–1	4–0	0–1	—

Source: Toto Cup Leumit 1985-86 (in Hebrew)
Rules for classification: 1st points; 2nd goal difference; 3rd matches won; 4th goals scored; 5th head-to-head; 6th decision match
(A) Advanced to semifinal

=== Group D ===
Pos	Team	Pld	W	D	L	GF	GA	GD	Pts	HBS	HLD	MJF	BEI
1	Hapoel Be'er Sheva (A)	6	3	1	2	9	7	+2	10	—	1–0	1–1	2–0
2	Hapoel Lod	6	3	0	3	8	10	−2	9	3–2	—	3–2	0–2
3	Maccabi Jaffa	6	2	2	2	11	10	+1	8	1–2	2–0	—	2–1
4	Beitar Jerusalem	6	2	1	3	9	10	−1	7	2–1	1–2	3–3	—

Source: Toto Cup Leumit 1985-86 (in Hebrew)
Rules for classification: 1st points; 2nd goal difference; 3rd matches won; 4th goals scored; 5th head-to-head; 6th decision match
(A) Advanced to semifinal

== Elimination rounds ==
=== Semifinals ===
24 January 1987	Shimshon Tel Aviv	1–0	Hapoel Be'er Sheva	Kfar Saba
12:30	Arbiv 60' (pen.)			Stadium: Levita Stadium; Attendance: 500; Referee: Itzhak Ben-Itzhak

24 January 1987	Maccabi Netanya	2–1 (a.e.t.)	Maccabi Tel Aviv	Kfar Saba
14:30	Menahem 23'; Azaria 103'		Driks 7'	Stadium: Levita Stadium; Attendance: 500; Referee: Ovadia Tzvi

=== Final ===
3 March 1987
16:00

Shimshon Tel Aviv	2–0	Maccabi Netanya
Ovadia 4', 61'

Ramat Gan Stadium
Referee: Arie Frost

== See also ==
- 1986–87 Toto Cup Artzit
