= List of foreign Ligue 1 players: I =

This is a list of foreign players in the French Ligue 1, which commenced play in 1932. The following players must meet both of the following two criteria:

1. Have played at least one Ligue 1 game. Players who were signed by Ligue 1 clubs, but only played in lower league, cup and/or European games, or did not play in any competitive games at all, are not included.
2. Are considered foreign, i.e., outside France and its dependencies (Guadeloupe, Martinique, Reunion Island or French Polynesia), determined by the following:

A player is considered foreign if he is not eligible to play for the national teams of France.

More specifically,

- If a player has been capped on international level, the national team is used; if he has been capped by more than one country, the highest level (or the most recent) team is used. These include French players with dual citizenship. Players who played for France but came as foreign players (such as Miguel Ángel Lauri) are also listed.
- If a player has not been capped on international level, his country of birth is used, except those who were born abroad from French parents or moved to France at a young age, and those who clearly indicated to have switched his nationality to another nation.

Clubs listed are those that the player has played at least one Ligue 1 game for.

Seasons listed are those that the player has played at least one Ligue 1 game in. Note that seasons, not calendar years, are used. For example, "1992–95" indicates that the player has played in every season from 1992–93 to 1994–95, but not necessarily every calendar year from 1992 to 1995.

In bold: players still active in Ligue 1 and their respective teams in current season.

== Iceland ==
- Thorolfur Beck – Rouen – 1966–67
- Arnór Guðjohnsen – Bordeaux – 1990–91
- Eiður Guðjohnsen – AS Monaco – 2009–10
- Albert Guðmundsson – FC Nancy, RC Paris, Nice – 1947–48, 1949–53
- Veigar Páll Gunnarsson – AS Nancy – 2008–09
- **Hákon Haraldsson** – **Lille** – 2023–
- Rúnar Alex Rúnarsson – Dijon – 2018–20
- Kolbeinn Sigþórsson – Nantes – 2015–18
- Karl Þórðarson – Laval – 1981–84
- Teitur Thordarson – Lens – 1981–83

== Indonesia ==
- **Calvin Verdonk** – **Lille** – 2025–

== Iran ==
- Saman Ghoddos – Amiens – 2018–21

== Ireland ==
- John Byrne – Le Havre AC – 1988–90
- Tony Cascarino – Marseille, AS Nancy – 1996–97, 1998–2000
- Tom Davis – FC Metz – 1934–35
- Michael Kelly – Marseille – 1948–49
- Noel King – Valenciennes FC – 1982–85
- Mick McCarthy – Lyon – 1989–90
- Jacko McDonagh – Nîmes Olympique – 1985–87
- Jake O'Brien – Lyon – 2023–24
- Andrew Omobamidele – Strasbourg – 2024–27
- Ike Orazi – Reims – 2024–25
- John Patrick – Reims – 2024–25
- Frank Stapleton – Le Havre AC – 1988–89
- Bernard Williams – Sochaux – 1932–39, 1945–46

== Israel ==
- Eliran Atar – Reims – 2013–15
- Tal Banin – Cannes – 1993–94
- Eden Ben Basat – Brest, Toulouse – 2011–14
- Ronnie Calderon – Paris FC – 1973–74
- Maor Melikson – Valenciennes – 2012–14
- Vicky Peretz – Strasbourg – 1980–82
- Itay Shechter – Nantes – 2013–15
- Giora Spiegel – Strasbourg, Lyon – 1973–78
- Mordechai Spiegler – Paris FC, Paris SG – 1972–74
- Shalom Tikva – Lens – 1991–92

== Italy ==
- Henri Alberto – Lyon, Monaco – 1954–56, 1956–61
- Gennaro Luigi Alfano – Toulon – 1983–93
- Mario Balotelli – Nice, Marseille – 2016–19
- Antonio Barreca – Monaco – 2018–19
- Cristian Battocchio – Brest – 2019–21
- Raoul Bellanova – Bordeaux – 2019–20
- Cesare Benedetti – Marseille, Toulouse FC – 1948–51
- Armando Bianchi – Paris SG – 1978–80
- Angelo Bollano – Marseille – 1948–50
- Gianluigi Buffon – Paris SG – 2018–19
- Arturo Calabresi – Amiens – 2019–20
- Aridex Calligaris – Saint-Étienne, Lyon – 1945–49, 1951–52
- Angelo Contini – Lens – 1950–51
- Elpidio Coppa – Rennes – 1948–49
- **Diego Coppola** – **Paris FC** – 2025–
- Alessandro Crescenzi – AC Ajaccio – 2013–14
- Paolo De Ceglie – Marseille – 2015–16
- Morgan De Sanctis – Monaco – 2016–17
- Mattia De Sciglio – Lyon – 2020–21
- Edmondo Della Valle – Nice – 1932–34
- Marco Di Costanzo – Nice, Rennes – 1994–95, 1997–98
- Marco Di Vaio – Monaco – 2006–07
- Gianluigi Donnarumma – Paris SG – 2021–25
- Stephan El Shaarawy – Monaco – 2015–16
- Félix Farina – Sedan – 1958–59
- Paolo Farina – Bastia – 1968–71
- Marcello Farrabi – Sedan – 1972–74
- Luiz Felipe – Marseille – 2024–25
- Emilio Ferlatti – Béziers – 1957–58
- Alessandro Florenzi – Paris SG – 2020–21
- Ivan Franceschini – Marseille – 1996–97
- Dante Gentini – Nice – 1956–57
- **Paolo Gozzi** – **Troyes** – 2026–
- Corrado Grossi – Marseille – 1948–49
- Fabio Grosso – Lyon – 2007–10
- Ciro Immobile – Paris FC – 2025–26
- Moise Kean – Paris SG – 2020–21
- **Luca Koleosho** – **Paris FC** – 2025–
- Pietro Landi – RC Paris, Nice, Troyes – 1949–53, 1954–56
- Luigi Lavecchia – Le Mans – 2005–06
- Dante Lerda – Cannes – 1938–39, 1945–49
- Alberto Malusci – Marseille – 1996–97
- Vito Mannone – Monaco, Lorient, Lille – 2020–21, 2022–24
- Renato Marchiaro – Nice – 1948–49 (or Alès)
- Renato Marin – Paris SG – 2025–26
- Pietro Migliaccio – Marseille – 1946–47
- Alberto Molina – Montpellier – 1952–53
- Stelvio Molinari – Nice – 1949–50
- Thiago Motta – Paris SG – 2011–18
- Cher Ndour – Paris SG – 2023–24
- **Nosa Edward Obaretin** – **Lorient** – 2026–
- Roberto Onorati – Nice – 1996–97
- Joseph Dayo Oshadogan – Monaco – 2003–05
- Michele Padovano – Metz – 1999–2000
- **Emerson Palmieri** – Lyon, **Marseille** – 2021–22, 2025–
- Christian Panucci – Monaco – 2000–02
- Pietro Pellegri – Monaco – 2017–19, 2020–21
- Alberto Poli – Angers, Paris SG, Rouen – 1965–68, 1969–75, 1977–78
- Ovilio Pratesi – Monaco – 1953–56
- Andrea Raggi – Monaco – 2013–19
- Fabrizio Ravanelli – Marseille – 1997–2000
- Francesco Rier – Nice – 1932–34
- Flavio Roma – Monaco – 2001–09
- Daniele Rugani – Rennes – 2020–21
- Ernesto Sandroni – Rennes – 1951–52
- Nello Sbaiz – Saint-Étienne – 1959–67
- Alfredo Scapinello – Le Havre – 1961–62
- Antonio Scavarini – Marseille – 1948–52
- Roberto Serone – Nice – 1949–51
- Marco Simone – Paris SG, Monaco, Nice – 1997–2001, 2003–04
- Salvatore Sirigu – Paris SG – 2011–16
- Alfredo Spadavecchia – Saint-Étienne – 1952–53
- Ernesto Tomasi – Nice, Cannes – 1932–33, 1946–47
- Denis Tonucci – AC Ajaccio – 2013–14
- Stefano Torrisi – Marseille – 2001–02
- Primo Vecchies – Stade Français – 1946–47, 1948–49
- Giuseppe Verk – SC Nîmes – 1932–33
- Marco Verratti – Paris SG – 2012–23
- Christian Vieri – Monaco – 2005–06
- Mattia Viti – Nice – 2022–23
- Aldo Vollono – Antibes – 1933–34
- Kelvin Yeboah – Montpellier – 2023–24

== References and notes ==
=== Books ===
- Barreaud, Marc (1998). Dictionnaire des footballeurs étrangers du championnat professionnel français (1932-1997). L'Harmattan, Paris. ISBN 2-7384-6608-7.
- Tamás Dénes; Pál Peterdi; Zoltán Rochy; József Selmeci (1999). Kalandozó magyar labdarúgók. ISBN 963-85967-0-8.

=== Club pages ===
- AJ Auxerre former players
- AJ Auxerre former players
- Girondins de Bordeaux former players
- Girondins de Bordeaux former players
- Les ex-Tangos (joueurs), Stade Lavallois former players
- Olympique Lyonnais former players
- Olympique de Marseille former players
- FC Metz former players
- AS Monaco FC former players
- Ils ont porté les couleurs de la Paillade... Montpellier HSC Former players
- AS Nancy former players
- FC Nantes former players
- Paris SG former players
- Red Star Former players
- Red Star former players
- Stade de Reims former players
- Stade Rennais former players
- CO Roubaix-Tourcoing former players
- AS Saint-Étienne former players
- Sporting Toulon Var former players

=== Others ===
- stat2foot
- footballenfrance
- French Clubs' Players in European Cups 1955-1995, RSSSF
- Finnish players abroad, RSSSF
- Italian players abroad, RSSSF
- Romanians who played in foreign championships
- Swiss players in France, RSSSF
- EURO 2008 CONNECTIONS: FRANCE, Stephen Byrne Bristol Rovers official site

=== Notes ===
1. Born in Argentina
2. Born in Brazil
3. Born in England
4. Born in Ghana
5. Born in Netherlands
6. Born in Russia (then part of the Soviet Union)
7. Born in Spain
8. Born in Sweden
9. Born in the United States
10. Capped for the Brazil national football team
11. Capped for the Brazil national under-23 football team
12. Capped for the Brazil national under-20 football team
13. Capped for the Brazil national under-17 football team
14. Capped for the Netherlands national under-21 football team
15. Capped for the Netherlands national under-19 football team
16. Capped for the Netherlands national under-17 football team
17. Capped for the Sweden men's national football team
18. Capped for the United States boys' national under-15 soccer team
