= Shimon Menachem =

Israeli footballer

Shimon Menahem שמעון מנחם
Personal information
- Full name: Shimon Menahem
- Date of birth: December 21, 1964 (age 61)
- Place of birth: Israel
- Position: Defender

Youth career
- Maccabi Netanya

Senior career*
Years	Team	Apps	(Gls)
1982–1991	Maccabi Netanya	204	(8)

International career
1988	Israel	1	(0)
- * Club domestic league appearances and goals

Shimon Menahem (Hebrew: שמעון מנחם) is a former Israeli footballer who turned to a multimillionaire as the CEO of the Scorpio real estate company

== Honours ==
- Championships
  - Runner-up (1): 1987-88
- League Cup
  - Winner (1): 1983
- Toto Cup
  - Runner-up (2): 1986–87, 1988–89
- UEFA Intertoto Cup
  - Winner (1): 1984

== Personal life ==
Shimon's older brother Yigal was a striker and both played together in Maccabi Netanya during the 1980s.
