= 1965–66 Liga Leumit =

Liga Leumit
- Season: 1965–66
- Champions: Hapoel Tel Aviv; 6th title
- Relegated: Maccabi Petah Tikva; Beitar Tel Aviv
- Top goalscorer: Moshe Romano; Mordechai Spiegler (17)

The 1965–66 Liga Leumit season saw Hapoel Tel Aviv crowned champions and qualify for the first Asian Club Championships. Moshe Romano (Shimshon Tel Aviv) and Mordechai Spiegler (Maccabi Netanya) were the joint top scorers with 17 goals each.

Maccabi Petah Tikva and Beitar Tel Aviv were relegated to Liga Alef.

== Rule changes ==
Prior to the season the IFA decided to allow substitutions of one player and one goalkeeper during matches.

== Final table ==
Pos	Team	Pld	W	D	L	GF	GA	GD	Pts	Qualification or relegation
1	Hapoel Tel Aviv	30	12	14	4	36	23	+13	38	Qualified for Asian Club Championship
2	Maccabi Tel Aviv	30	14	6	10	45	29	+16	34	
3	Hapoel Petah Tikva	30	10	14	6	42	29	+13	34	
4	Maccabi Netanya	30	13	8	9	49	35	+14	34	
5	Hapoel Ramat Gan	30	12	10	8	40	32	+8	34	
6	Shimshon Tel Aviv	30	12	8	10	37	31	+6	32	
7	Hapoel Haifa	30	12	8	10	31	32	−1	32	
8	Hapoel Mahane Yehuda	30	11	9	10	36	38	−2	31	
9	Hakoah Ramat Gan	30	9	12	9	37	34	+3	30	
10	Bnei Yehuda	30	9	10	11	31	38	−7	28	
11	Maccabi Jaffa	30	9	10	11	33	41	−8	28	
12	Hapoel Jerusalem	30	9	10	11	29	40	−11	28	
13	Hapoel Be'er Sheva	30	9	9	12	21	25	−4	27	
14	Maccabi Sha'arayim	30	10	7	13	33	40	−7	27	
15	Maccabi Petah Tikva	30	7	9	14	26	43	−17	23	Relegated to Liga Alef
16	Beitar Tel Aviv	30	5	10	15	21	37	−16	20	Relegated to Liga Alef

Source: rsssf.com

== Results ==
Home \ Away	BTA	BnY	HAR	HBS	HHA	HJE	HMY	HPT	HRG	HTA	MJA	MNE	MPT	MSH	MTA	STA
Beitar Tel Aviv	—	1–4	0–0	1–0	0–1	2–0	2–1	0–0	1–2	0–0	0–2	4–1	1–1	1–2	0–4	0–2
Bnei Yehuda	1–0	—	2–2	0–0	4–1	2–0	2–0	0–1	1–3	0–1	2–2	1–1	0–3	2–1	1–0	2–1
Hakoah Ramat Gan	2–1	2–0	—	2–0	0–0	1–1	2–1	1–1	0–1	0–0	0–1	2–1	0–0	1–1	2–1	1–1
Hapoel Be'er Sheva	0–1	2–0	1–0	—	0–1	0–1	3–1	1–4	0–1	1–1	0–0	4–0	0–0	1–0	0–1	0–1
Hapoel Haifa	1–0	0–0	2–1	0–0	—	1–0	0–0	1–0	4–2	0–2	1–0	1–1	5–0	1–0	0–1	2–1
Hapoel Jerusalem	1–1	1–1	3–1	0–1	1–1	—	2–2	0–1	2–1	1–3	3–0	1–1	1–0	0–0	2–1	1–0
Hapoel Mahane Yehuda	2–2	2–1	2–3	2–0	2–0	3–1	—	0–0	1–1	1–3	2–1	1–0	0–1	1–1	0–0	1–0
Hapoel Petah Tikva	0–0	3–0	0–0	0–1	2–0	1–2	3–1	—	1–1	1–1	3–0	3–0	1–1	1–0	3–1	1–3
Hapoel Ramat Gan	1–0	1–1	2–1	0–0	1–0	7–0	1–2	2–2	—	1–0	1–1	1–1	3–0	0–0	0–2	0–2
Hapoel Tel Aviv	0–0	0–0	0–3	1–0	1–1	0–0	0–0	2–2	4–1	—	5–3	1–3	3–2	2–0	2–0	1–0
Maccabi Jaffa	0–0	2–2	3–1	1–2	2–1	2–0	1–2	1–5	1–3	0–0	—	0–0	1–0	3–1	2–0	0–3
Maccabi Netanya	4–1	4–0	2–1	3–0	3–0	1–3	2–1	1–1	0–0	1–0	0–1	—	1–2	4–0	2–1	2–2
Maccabi Petah Tikva	2–1	0–0	1–3	1–2	2–0	1–1	0–2	1–1	1–2	0–0	1–1	0–5	—	1–3	1–0	1–2
Maccabi Sha'arayim	1–0	0–2	2–2	2–2	1–2	2–0	5–1	2–0	1–0	0–0	2–0	1–3	1–0	—	2–1	1–2
Maccabi Tel Aviv	1–0	3–0	3–2	0–0	3–2	1–1	0–0	3–1	0–0	2–2	2–0	2–1	2–1	5–0	—	1–2
Shimshon Tel Aviv	1–1	1–0	1–1	0–0	2–2	2–0	1–2	1–1	3–1	0–1	0–0	0–1	1–2	2–1	0–4	—

Legend: Blue = home team win; Yellow = draw; Red = away team win.
