= 1976–77 Liga Leumit =

Liga Leumit
- Season: 1976–77
- Champions: Maccabi Tel Aviv; 13th title
- Relegated: Hapoel Kfar Saba; Maccabi Haifa; Maccabi Petah Tikva
- Top goalscorer: Vicky Peretz (17)

The 1976–77 Liga Leumit season saw Maccabi Tel Aviv win the title, with striker Vicky Peretz ending as the league's top scorer with 17 goals.

Three clubs, Hapoel Kfar Saba, Maccabi Haifa and Maccabi Petah Tikva, were relegated as the league was reduced to 14 clubs for the following season. Hapoel Be'er Sheva finished one place above the relegation zone a year after winning the title.

== Final table ==
Pos	Team	Pld	W	D	L	GF	GA	GD	Pts	Qualification or relegation
1	Maccabi Tel Aviv (C)	30	16	10	4	47	26	+21	42	Qualification for the Intertoto Cup
2	Maccabi Jaffa	30	15	9	6	29	17	+12	39	Qualification for the Intertoto Cup
3	Beitar Jerusalem	30	12	9	9	35	23	+12	33	
4	Beitar Tel Aviv	30	13	7	10	32	26	+6	33	
5	Maccabi Netanya	30	12	9	9	40	34	+6	33	
6	Hapoel Tel Aviv	30	9	14	7	38	30	+8	32	
7	Hapoel Yehud	30	9	14	7	22	22	0	32	
8	Shimshon Tel Aviv	30	10	11	9	33	32	+1	31	
9	Hapoel Haifa	30	9	11	10	26	24	+2	29	
10	Hapoel Jerusalem	30	8	12	10	24	25	−1	28	
11	Hapoel Acre	30	8	12	10	33	39	−6	28	
12	Hakoah Ramat Gan	30	7	13	10	25	29	−4	27	
13	Hapoel Be'er Sheva	30	9	9	12	26	31	−5	27	
14	Hapoel Kfar Saba (R)	30	6	13	11	37	41	−4	25	Relegated to Liga Artzit
15	Maccabi Haifa (R)	30	7	10	13	25	42	−17	24	Relegated to Liga Artzit
16	Maccabi Petah Tikva (R)	30	5	7	18	20	51	−31	17	Relegated to Liga Artzit

Source: rsssf.com
(C) Champions; (R) Relegated

== Results ==
Home \ Away	BEI	BTA	HAR	HAC	HBS	HHA	HJE	HKS	HTA	HYE	MHA	MJA	MNE	MPT	MTA	STA
Beitar Jerusalem	—	2–1	0–1	3–2	1–0	0–0	1–0	1–1	2–0	1–0	4–0	0–0	1–0	2–0	0–2	2–2
Beitar Tel Aviv	0–2	—	0–0	2–2	0–0	2–0	2–2	4–2	0–0	2–0	4–1	2–1	2–1	3–1	3–1	2–0
Hakoah Ramat Gan	2–1	0–0	—	0–2	3–0	3–0	1–0	1–2	0–0	1–1	1–0	0–0	2–2	1–1	0–2	1–1
Hapoel Acre	1–0	2–1	1–1	—	0–0	0–0	2–2	2–1	1–1	3–0	1–1	1–0	0–3	1–0	1–2	0–0
Hapoel Be'er Sheva	1–0	1–2	1–1	1–0	—	1–0	0–1	2–1	1–0	1–2	1–2	0–0	2–0	2–0	1–2	0–3
Hapoel Haifa	1–0	3–0	4–1	1–0	0–0	—	0–0	2–0	1–1	0–1	0–0	2–0	2–0	2–1	0–0	2–3
Hapoel Jerusalem	1–1	2–0	1–0	1–0	2–1	0–0	—	1–1	0–1	1–1	0–1	3–0	0–1	0–0	1–1	0–0
Hapoel Kfar Saba	1–1	0–2	0–0	2–2	1–1	1–0	0–1	—	1–1	0–0	3–1	0–0	2–0	7–1	1–3	3–0
Hapoel Tel Aviv	2–1	3–2	1–0	4–0	2–2	0–0	3–1	0–0	—	0–0	2–0	1–2	1–2	3–1	2–3	3–1
Hapoel Yehud	0–0	0–0	2–0	1–1	2–1	0–0	2–1	1–1	1–0	—	2–0	0–2	1–1	0–0	0–0	2–0
Maccabi Haifa	1–6	0–0	2–1	1–1	0–1	0–0	3–1	4–0	2–2	1–0	—	0–2	0–0	3–1	2–4	0–2
Maccabi Jaffa	2–1	1–0	2–0	2–1	0–0	2–1	0–0	3–1	0–0	0–1	0–0	—	0–1	2–0	1–0	1–1
Maccabi Netanya	0–0	0–1	0–0	4–1	0–1	3–0	1–0	2–1	2–2	1–0	1–0	1–2	—	1–0	1–0	2–3
Maccabi Petah Tikva	1–0	2–1	0–2	1–2	1–1	0–4	0–2	2–1	1–1	2–0	2–0	0–1	1–1	—	0–2	1–1
Maccabi Tel Aviv	1–1	4–1	1–1	3–3	2–1	3–1	2–0	1–1	1–1	1–1	0–0	0–2	1–0	3–0	—	1–0
Shimshon Tel Aviv	0–1	1–1	2–1	1–0	3–2	2–0	0–0	2–2	2–1	1–1	0–0	0–1	0–1	2–0	0–1	—

Legend: Blue = home team win; Yellow = draw; Red = away team win.
