= Darren Lurie =

South African-Israeli footballer

Darren Lurie דארן איאן לורי
Personal information
- Full name: Darren Ian Lurie
- Date of birth: 22 May 1992 (age 34)
- Place of birth: Johannesburg, South Africa
- Height: 1.78 m (5 ft 10 in)
- Position: Forward

Team information
- Current team: Shimshon Tel Aviv

Youth career
- Balfour Park

Senior career*
Years	Team	Apps	(Gls)
2013–2014	Moroka Swallows	2	(0)
2014–2015	Cape Town City	2	(0)
2015–2016	Black Aces	0	(0)
2016–2017	Hapoel Afula	3	(1)
2019–2020	F.C. Ironi Or Yehuda	4	(0)
2020	Maccabi Yavne	3	(0)
2020–	Shimshon Tel Aviv	0	(0)
- * Club domestic league appearances and goals as of 2 June 2021

Darren Ian Lurie (Hebrew: דארן איאן לורי; born 22 May 1992) is a South African-Israeli footballer who plays as a forward for Shimshon Tel Aviv.

== Early life ==
Lurie grew up in Johannesburg, South Africa, the grandson of a Holocaust survivor from Lithuania. At the age of 24, he made aliyah to Israel after being released by Black Aces of the South African Premiership.
