= 1972–73 Liga Leumit =

Liga Leumit
- Season: 1972–73
- Champions: Hakoah Ramat Gan; 2nd title
- Relegated: Shimshon Tel Aviv; Hapoel Marmorek
- Top goalscorer: Moshe Romano (18)

The 1972–73 Liga Leumit season saw Hakoah Ramat Gan win their second title, whilst Shimshon Tel Aviv and Hapoel Marmorek (in their first, and to date, only season in the top division) were relegated. Moshe Romano of Beitar Tel Aviv was the league's top scorer with 18 goals.

== Final table ==
Pos	Team	Pld	W	D	L	GF	GA	GD	Pts	Relegation
1	Hakoah Ramat Gan	30	16	10	4	41	20	+21	42	
2	Hapoel Tel Aviv	30	14	9	7	45	34	+11	37	
3	Hapoel Jerusalem	30	13	10	7	30	19	+11	36	
4	Maccabi Tel Aviv	30	8	17	5	31	23	+8	33	
5	Hapoel Be'er Sheva	30	11	10	9	41	35	+6	32	
6	Hapoel Kfar Saba	30	7	17	6	31	27	+4	31	
7	Hapoel Haifa	30	9	12	9	31	28	+3	30	
8	Beitar Tel Aviv	30	8	14	8	24	25	−1	30	
9	Maccabi Petah Tikva	30	9	12	9	39	41	−2	30	
10	Maccabi Jaffa	30	10	9	11	35	33	+2	29	
11	Maccabi Haifa	30	8	13	9	29	36	−7	29	
12	Hapoel Petah Tikva	30	8	12	10	26	26	0	28	
13	Maccabi Netanya	30	8	10	12	28	39	−11	26	
14	Beitar Jerusalem	30	8	9	13	21	34	−13	25	
15	Shimshon Tel Aviv	30	7	10	13	36	46	−10	24	Relegated to Liga Alef
16	Hapoel Marmorek	30	5	8	17	25	47	−22	18	Relegated to Liga Alef

Source: rsssf.com

== Results ==
Home \ Away	BEI	BTA	HAR	HBS	HHA	HJE	HKS	HMA	HPT	HTA	MHA	MJA	MNE	MPT	MTA	STA
Beitar Jerusalem	—	3–1	0–1	1–2	0–2	0–3	1–0	1–0	1–0	1–2	0–0	1–1	0–0	1–0	1–0	1–0
Beitar Tel Aviv	1–1	—	0–0	1–3	0–1	0–2	1–1	2–0	0–0	1–1	2–2	0–0	0–2	3–0	1–1	4–0
Hakoah Ramat Gan	0–0	0–0	—	1–3	2–0	1–0	3–1	3–0	1–1	1–2	1–0	1–0	1–0	4–4	1–1	2–3
Hapoel Be'er Sheva	2–0	0–0	1–1	—	3–0	1–2	0–0	2–2	1–1	0–0	4–2	0–1	3–0	0–2	1–2	2–1
Hapoel Haifa	7–2	0–0	0–1	0–3	—	3–0	0–1	1–0	0–0	1–1	1–2	2–0	2–0	1–1	1–1	1–1
Hapoel Jerusalem	0–0	1–0	0–0	3–0	1–1	—	1–1	1–0	2–0	1–0	0–1	1–0	0–0	2–1	0–1	2–0
Hapoel Kfar Saba	3–2	1–1	0–1	0–0	4–1	0–0	—	2–2	1–1	1–2	1–1	0–0	3–1	4–0	0–0	0–0
Hapoel Marmorek	0–1	0–1	0–2	2–3	0–1	1–1	0–1	—	1–0	2–2	0–0	3–1	2–2	1–1	1–1	2–0
Hapoel Petah Tikva	1–0	2–0	1–1	4–0	0–0	1–1	0–0	0–1	—	0–1	3–0	0–1	2–1	0–2	1–1	1–0
Hapoel Tel Aviv	3–2	0–0	0–2	2–4	1–0	0–0	3–0	1–0	3–2	—	5–1	2–1	1–3	1–1	1–2	1–4
Maccabi Haifa	1–1	0–1	0–2	2–0	0–0	2–1	0–0	1–2	1–0	1–1	—	1–0	2–0	1–1	2–0	0–0
Maccabi Jaffa	2–0	0–1	0–0	2–1	1–3	2–0	2–2	3–1	4–0	1–0	1–1	—	3–0	1–1	0–2	2–0
Maccabi Netanya	1–0	0–1	1–0	1–0	1–1	2–1	1–2	3–1	1–1	0–3	1–1	1–0	—	1–1	0–0	1–1
Maccabi Petah Tikva	1–0	3–0	1–3	1–1	1–1	1–2	2–1	3–1	0–1	0–3	2–0	3–3	2–1	—	0–0	1–1
Maccabi Tel Aviv	0–0	1–1	0–2	0–0	0–0	0–2	0–0	4–0	0–2	1–1	3–3	0–0	1–1	1–0	—	5–1
Shimshon Tel Aviv	0–0	0–1	1–3	1–1	1–0	0–0	1–1	3–0	1–1	1–2	3–1	6–3	4–2	2–3	0–3	—

Legend: Blue = home team win; Yellow = draw; Red = away team win.
