= Isaac Peretz =

Isaac Peretz may refer to:

- Isaac Peretz, known as Vicky Peretz, Israeli footballer
- Isaac Leib Peretz, Polish author
