= Avi Cohen (disambiguation) =

Avi Cohen is an Israeli footballer, born 1956

Avi Cohen may also refer to:

- Avi Cohen (footballer, born 1962)
- Avi Cohen (film director) (born 1944)
