= 1997–98 Liga Artzit =

The 1997–98 Liga Artzit season saw Maccabi Jaffa win the title and earn promotion to the top division. Tzafririm Holon were also promoted.

At the other end of the table, Hapoel Ramat Gan and Maccabi Yavne were relegated to Liga Alef.

== Final table ==
Pos	Team	Pld	W	D	L	GF	GA	GD	Pts	Promotion or relegation
1	Maccabi Jaffa	30	20	9	1	64	24	+40	69	Promoted to Liga Leumit
2	Tzafririm Holon	30	20	8	2	58	20	+38	68	Promoted to Liga Leumit
3	Hapoel Ashdod	30	15	10	5	59	37	+22	55	
4	Hakoah Ramat Gan	30	12	8	10	38	31	+7	44	
5	Maccabi Netanya	30	11	11	8	43	43	0	44	
6	Beitar Tel Aviv	30	11	7	12	33	36	−3	40	
7	Hapoel Bat Yam	30	11	7	12	40	44	−4	40	
8	Hapoel Tayibe	30	10	10	10	36	36	0	39 (Note: The Hapoel Tayibe vs Bnei Sakhnin match was abandoned due to crowd trouble. The match was not replayed and neither club was awarded points for the game.)	
9	Bnei Sakhnin	30	10	9	11	43	41	+2	38	
10	SK Nes Tziona	30	9	10	11	49	40	+9	37	
11	Maccabi Acre	30	9	9	12	33	47	−14	36	
12	Maccabi Kiryat Gat	30	10	7	13	47	41	+6	34 (Note: 3 points deducted.)	
13	Maccabi Kafr Kanna	30	8	10	12	29	39	−10	34	
14	Hapoel Lod	30	8	10	12	45	53	−8	32 (Note: 2 points deducted.)	
15	Hapoel Ramat Gan	30	6	8	16	31	52	−21	26	Relegated to Liga Alef
16	Maccabi Yavne	30	1	5	24	24	88	−64	8	Relegated to Liga Alef

Source: rsssf.com
