= Zion Ohana =

Israeli footballer (born 1965)

Zion Ohana ציון אוחנה
Personal information
- Full name: Zion Ohana
- Date of birth: 1 June 1965 (age 61)
- Place of birth: Jerusalem, Israel
- Positions: Right back; centre back

Youth career
- 1977–1982: Hapoel Jerusalem

Senior career*
Years	Team	Apps	(Gls)
1982–1991	Hapoel Jerusalem		
1991–1992	Beitar Jerusalem		
- * Club domestic league appearances and goals

Zion Ohana (Hebrew: ציון אוחנה; born 25 November 1965) is an Israeli former footballer.

== Personal life ==
Ohana born in Kiryat HaYovel neighbourhood in Jerusalem to a Moroccan-Jewish family. His older brother is Eli Ohana. He is divorced and he has a son and a daughter.

== Career ==
Ohana started to play football in Hapoel Jerusalem's youth team. On 12 March 1983 he made his senior debut in the 1–2 loss to Maccabi Tel Aviv in Bloomfield Stadium when Ohana scored in the 81st minute.

In 1991, he moved to Beitar Jerusalem one season after they were relegated to the second league. In 1992, he was injured during training after an encounter with his brother, Eli before retiring a few months later.
