= Herzl Kabilio =

Israeli footballer (1951–1986)

Herzl Kabilio הרצל קביליו
Personal information
- Date of birth: 13 January 1951
- Place of birth: Iraq
- Date of death: 25 February 1986 (aged 35)
- Place of death: Israel
- Position: Goalkeeper

Senior career*
Years	Team	Apps	(Gls)
1972–1984	Maccabi Jaffa		
1984–1986	Hapoel Jerusalem		
- * Club domestic league appearances and goals

Herzl Kabilio (Hebrew: הרצל קביליו; 13 January 1951 – 25 February 1986) was an Israeli singer and former footballer.

== Football career ==
Before going into singing, Kabilio was a professional footballer, described as a "legendary" player. He played as a goalkeeper, mainly for Israeli side Maccabi Jaffa. In total he made 223 league appearances for Maccabi Jaffa.

== Football legacy ==
Israeli side Maccabi Kabilio Jaffa, founded in 2007, was named in honor of Herzl Kabilio.

== Singing career ==
After retiring from professional football, Kabilio worked as a singer, and was most known for his song "Another Saturday Of Football".

== Personal life ==
Kabilio was married and had a daughter and son.
