= 1969–70 Liga Leumit =

Liga Leumit
- Season: 1969–70
- Champions: Maccabi Tel Aviv; 11th title
- Relegated: Maccabi Jaffa; Hapoel Be'er Sheva
- Top goalscorer: Moshe Romano (15)

The 1969–70 Liga Leumit season saw Maccabi Tel Aviv win the title on goal difference from city rivals, Hapoel, and qualify for the 1971 Asian Club Championship. Maccabi Jaffa and Hapoel Be'er Sheva were relegated to Liga Alef. Moshe Romano of Shimshon Tel Aviv was the league's top scorer with 15 goals.

Starting from this season the first tiebreaker in case teams were equal on points was set to be goal difference.

== Final table ==
Pos	Team	Pld	W	D	L	GF	GA	GD	Pts	Qualification or relegation
1	Maccabi Tel Aviv	30	15	9	6	51	21	+30	39	Qualified for 1971 Asian Champion Club Tournament
2	Hapoel Tel Aviv	30	13	13	4	48	24	+24	39	
3	Maccabi Haifa	30	10	13	7	29	24	+5	33	
4	Shimshon Tel Aviv	30	10	11	9	35	27	+8	31	
5	Beitar Jerusalem	30	10	10	10	29	29	0	30	
6	Hapoel Jerusalem	30	10	10	10	35	37	−2	30	
7	Hapoel Petah Tikva	30	8	14	8	25	28	−3	30	
8	Hakoah Ramat Gan	30	6	17	7	21	26	−5	29	
9	Beitar Tel Aviv	30	8	13	9	28	34	−6	29	
10	Hapoel Haifa	30	7	14	9	19	18	+1	28	
11	Maccabi Netanya	30	7	14	9	29	30	−1	28	
12	Maccabi Petah Tikva	30	7	14	9	32	37	−5	28	
13	Hapoel Kfar Saba	30	7	14	9	27	32	−5	28	
14	Bnei Yehuda	30	6	15	9	24	28	−4	27	
15	Maccabi Jaffa	30	7	12	11	17	29	−12	26	Relegated to Liga Alef
16	Hapoel Be'er Sheva	30	10	5	15	24	49	−25	25	Relegated to Liga Alef

Source: rsssf.com

== Results ==
Home \ Away	BEI	BTA	BnY	HAR	HBS	HHA	HJE	HKS	HPT	HTA	MHA	MJA	MNE	MPT	MTA	STA
Beitar Jerusalem	—	0–2	2–0	2–0	1–0	0–2	1–0	2–0	3–0	1–1	0–1	1–0	2–1	2–3	2–3	0–0
Beitar Tel Aviv	0–0	—	1–1	2–0	3–0	0–1	0–0	2–2	1–1	2–1	1–0	0–0	0–1	3–2	0–0	0–1
Bnei Yehuda	1–1	1–1	—	0–1	2–0	0–0	1–1	1–1	1–0	0–2	0–0	1–1	3–0	0–0	0–1	0–0
Hakoah Ramat Gan	0–1	3–1	2–2	—	0–0	0–0	2–2	0–0	0–0	1–1	1–1	1–0	1–1	1–1	3–1	0–1
Hapoel Be'er Sheva	2–0	3–0	0–1	2–0	—	1–0	2–1	0–2	1–2	0–4	2–0	2–1	0–0	2–2	0–3	2–0
Hapoel Haifa	0–1	0–1	0–0	0–0	1–0	—	1–1	2–0	0–0	0–0	2–1	0–1	0–1	5–0	0–0	2–2
Hapoel Jerusalem	3–1	0–2	1–0	1–1	1–1	3–0	—	4–1	1–0	0–0	1–1	0–0	3–2	4–1	2–1	0–0
Hapoel Kfar Saba	0–0	1–1	2–2	0–1	3–0	0–0	4–0	—	1–1	0–2	0–3	1–0	1–1	1–1	0–0	1–0
Hapoel Petah Tikva	0–0	2–2	2–1	1–1	0–0	0–0	2–3	2–2	—	1–1	0–2	0–1	1–0	1–1	0–1	1–2
Hapoel Tel Aviv	2–0	2–2	0–1	0–0	8–0	0–0	4–0	0–0	1–1	—	5–1	0–0	1–4	2–1	2–1	1–1
Maccabi Haifa	1–0	1–0	1–0	0–0	3–0	1–1	2–0	0–1	0–0	2–3	—	2–0	0–0	1–1	0–0	0–0
Maccabi Jaffa	1–1	1–0	1–1	0–0	0–1	0–0	1–0	0–1	0–1	0–2	0–3	—	3–2	1–1	3–1	2–1
Maccabi Netanya	1–1	1–1	2–1	1–1	0–1	1–0	3–0	2–2	1–2	0–2	0–0	0–0	—	2–2	1–1	0–0
Maccabi Petah Tikva	1–1	1–0	1–1	0–1	6–0	0–1	1–0	1–0	0–1	0–1	0–0	0–0	1–0	—	1–0	0–3
Maccabi Tel Aviv	1–1	7–0	3–0	1–0	2–0	1–0	2–0	3–0	0–1	5–0	1–1	6–0	0–0	2–2	—	3–2
Shimshon Tel Aviv	3–2	0–0	1–2	4–0	3–2	3–1	0–2	1–0	1–2	0–0	5–1	0–0	0–1	1–1	0–1	—

Legend: Blue = home team win; Yellow = draw; Red = away team win.
