= Moris Jano =

Israeli footballer

Moris Jano מוריס ז'אנו
Personal information
- Full name: Moris Jano
- Date of birth: May 8, 1958 (age 68)
- Place of birth: Morocco
- Positions: Attacking midfielder; forward

Team information
- Current team: Hapoel Ashdod (manager)

Youth career
- Hapoel Ashkelon

Senior career*
Years	Team	Apps	(Gls)
1974–1979	Hapoel Ashkelon		
1980–1981	Hapoel Be'er Sheva		
1981–1991	Hapoel Tel Aviv	251	(54)
1991–1992	Hapoel Ashdod		

International career
1983–1984	Israel	5	(0)

Managerial career
- 2001: Maccabi Ashkelon
- 2006–2007: Maccabi Kiryat Gat
- 2007: Hapoel Kfar Shalem
- 2008: Maccabi Kiryat Gat
- 2008–2009: Hapoel Masos Segev Shalom
- 2009: Maccabi Kiryat Gat
- 2010: Maccabi Kiryat Malakhi
- 2011: Hapoel Ashkelon
- 2011: Maccabi Kiryat Malakhi
- 2012: F.C. Kiryat Gat
- 2012–2013: Hapoel Tel Aviv (youth)
- 2015: Hapoel Ashdod
- * Club domestic league appearances and goals

Moris Kano (Hebrew: מוריס ז'אנו; born 8 May 1958) is an Israeli former footballer.

== Career ==
Jano was born in Morocco, moved to Israel at a young age, and grew up in Ashkelon. Jano started playing football for Hapoel Ashkelon and at age 16, he joined the seniors. After enlisting exams approached Air Force football championship, he met Hapoel Tel Aviv soccer player Ya'akov Ekhoiz, who recommended him to join to Hapoel. Hapoel Tel Aviv wanted join the player to the club, but Ashkelon created difficulties for the transition, and Jano came for closure. During the year, it did not play a severed connection between the player and Hapoel Tel Aviv, and in 1980 he signed with Hapoel Be'er Sheva. On the 24th round, he scored against Hapoel Tel Aviv at the time fought for the championship. At the end of the game won Hapoel Tel Aviv 1-2 and coach, David Schweitzer, came up to Jano and asked him to contact him at the end of the season. After winning the championship, signing Hapoel Tel Aviv in summer 1981. At his debut at Hapoel Tel Aviv, scored his first goal against Hapoel Jerusalem. With Hapoel he won the championship in 1986 and 1988. In 1991, he moved to Hapoel Ashdod.

On 15 February 1983 he made his debut at Israel national football team against Belgium, On 11 January 1984 he made his last cap at the national team against Portugal.
