= Vicky Peretz =

Israeli footballer (1953–2021)

Personal information
- Full name: Yitzhak Peretz
- Date of birth: 11 February 1953
- Place of birth: Kfar Saba, Israel
- Date of death: 29 June 2021 (aged 68)
- Height: 1.76 m (5 ft 9 in)
- Position: Striker

Youth career
- 1962–1971: Maccabi Ramat Amidar

Senior career*
Years	Team	Apps	(Gls)
1971–1973	Maccabi Ramat Amidar	90	(52)
1973–1980	Maccabi Tel Aviv	160	(58)
1980–1982	Strasbourg	71	(27)
1982–1983	Rennes	33	(17)
1983–1985	Maccabi Tel Aviv	37	(9)
1985–1986	Shimshon Tel Aviv	27	(7)
1986	Beitar Netanya	5	(0)
1986–1987	Hapoel Lod	21	(7)
1988–1991	Maccabi HaShikma Ramat Hen		

International career
1973–1983	Israel	40	(14)

Managerial career
- 1997–1999: Hapoel Tel Aviv (assistant manager)
- 2006–2007: Maccabi Tel Aviv (assistant manager)
- 2008: Maccabi HaShikma Ramat Hen
- 2009: Hakoah Amidar Ramat Gan
- * Club domestic league appearances and goals

Vicky Peretz
Medal record

Representing Israel

Football

Maccabiah Games
Gold medal – first place	1973 Maccabiah	Football

Yitzhak "Vicky" Peretz (Hebrew: יצחק "ויקי" פרץ; 11 February 1953 – 29 June 2021) was an Israeli football player and manager. He played for Maccabi Ramat Amidar, Maccabi Tel Aviv, Strasbourg, Rennes, Maccabi Tel Aviv, Shimshon Tel Aviv, Beitar Netanya, Hapoel Lod, and Maccabi HaShikma Ramat Hen. He earned a gold medal playing for Israel at the 1973 Maccabiah Games, and in 1976 he played for the Israel national football team in the Montreal Olympics.

== Personal life ==
Peretz was born in Kfar Saba, Israel. He later lived in Ramat Gan, Israel.

His son, Omer, has followed in his father's footsteps. His brother in law was Avi Cohen, former international footballer, and his nephew is Tamir Cohen. Peretz died at 68 years of age on 29 June 2021, apparently by suicide.

== Playing career ==
Peretz was the leading scorer of the Israel national under-19 football team that competed at the 1972 Asian Football Conference Youth Championship. His 12 goals gave him the golden boot title of the tournament.

He began his career in the Maccabi Ramat Amidar youth department. Peretz then played for its first team, turning professional in 1971.

Peretz signed at 20 years of age with Maccabi Tel Aviv in 1973—playing with them for the next seven years, and that season he was the team's top scorer with 19 goals. He was Liga Leumit's top scorer with 17 goals in the 1976-77 season in which Maccabi won the title. With Maccabi in 1978-79 campaign, he had 17 goals across all competitions.

He earned a gold medal playing for Team Israel at the 1973 Maccabiah Games. In 1976 Peretz played for the Israel national football team in the Montreal Olympics.

In 1980, Peretz left Israel to join French side RC Strasbourg. Over the next two years he scored 27 goals in 71 appearances in France's premier league.

Peretz then moved to France's Stade Rennais two years later. He scored 17 goals in 33 appearances with the team in 1982–83.

In 1983, he returned to Maccabi Tel Aviv for two more seasons. With the club, Peretz had a total of 101 goals in 250 appearances in all competitions, ranking him 8th among all-time scorers for the club.

In 1985 Peretz switched to Shimshon Tel Aviv, playing for them in 1985–86. Over the following years he played for Beitar Netanya (1986), Hapoel Lod (1986–87), and Maccabi HaShikma Ramat Hen. He retired in 1991.

During his playing career with the Israel national team from 1973 to 1983 Peretz won 40 caps, scoring 14 goals.

== Coaching career ==
Peretz was Assistant Manager for Hapoel Tel Aviv from 1997 to 1999. He coached the Israeli under-16 national youth football team from 2003 to 2005.

In 2006, he was appointed Assistant Manager at Maccabi Tel Aviv. Peretz left the club in 2007. He coached Maccabi HaShikma Ramat Hen in 2008, and Hakoah Ramat Gan in 2009.

== Honours ==
- Israeli Premier League: 1976–77, 1978–79
- Israel State Cup: 1977
- Israel Super Cup: 1979

== See also ==
- List of foreign Ligue 1 players: I
- List of Israel international footballers
- List of RC Strasbourg Alsace players
