= Moshe Romano =

Israeli international footballer

Moshe Romano משה רומנו

Personal information
- Full name: Moshe Romano
- Date of birth: 6 May 1946 (age 80)
- Place of birth: Tel Aviv, Mandatory Palestine
- Position: Striker

Senior career*
Years	Team	Apps	(Gls)
- Shimshon Tel Aviv
- Beitar Tel Aviv

International career
1965–1975	Israel	12	(5)
- * Club domestic league appearances and goals

Moshe Romano (Hebrew: משה רומנו; born 6 May 1946) is an Israeli former international footballer.

== Career ==
=== Club career ===
Romano played club football for Shimshon Tel Aviv and Beitar Tel Aviv, and was top scorer in the 1965–66, 1969–1970, 1972–1973 and 1974–75 seasons, scoring a total of 193 goals in the Israeli First Division between 1965 and 1982.

=== International career ===
Romano represented Israel at the international level and competed in the 1968 AFC Asian Cup and 1970 FIFA World Cup. Romano earned a total of 12 caps between 1965 and 1975, scoring 5 goals.

== See also ==
- List of Jewish footballers
