= Avraham Abukarat =

Israeli association football player

Avraham Abukarat אברהם אבוקרט
Personal information
- Full name: Avraham Abukarat
- Date of birth: 14 February 1960 (age 66)
- Place of birth: Haifa, Israel
- Height: 1.70 m (5 ft 7 in)
- Position: Midfielder

Youth career
- 1969–1977: Maccabi Haifa

Senior career*
Years	Team	Apps	(Gls)
1977–1993	Maccabi Haifa	396	(9)

Managerial career
- 1993–1998: Maccabi Haifa (assistant)
- 1998: Hapoel Beit She'an
- 2012–2015: Maccabi Haifa (youth)
- 2020–2021: Hapoel Nof HaGalil (youth)
- * Club domestic league appearances and goals

Avraham Abukarat (Hebrew: אברהם אבוקרט; born 14 February 1960) is an Israeli retired international football player. He is the father of Ran Abukarat.

== Career ==
Abukarat was born to a Moroccan-Jewish family in Wadi Salib neighbourhood. When he was 9 years old, he joined the Maccabi Haifa's children team. On 1 January 1977, he made his senior debut in the league game against Hapoel Acre.

Abukarat was a partner in winning the club's first four championships and a double in 1990–91 season.

== Honours ==
=== Club ===
Maccabi Haifa

- Israel championship (4): 1983–84, 1984–85, 1988–89, 1990–91
- Israel State Cup (1): 1990–91
