= Eli Uzan =

Israeli footballer

Eli Uzan אלי אוזן
Personal information
- Date of birth: 21 March 1963
- Place of birth: Beersheba, Israel
- Date of death: 23 November 2009 (aged 46)
- Place of death: Beersheba, Israel
- Position: Defender

Senior career*
Years	Team	Apps	(Gls)
1980–1984	Hapoel Be'er Sheva		
1984–1992	Hapoel Tel Aviv		
1992–1994	Tzafririm Holon		
Total		296	(7)

International career
1983	Israel U23	1	(0)
- * Club domestic league appearances and goals

Eli Uzan (Hebrew: אלי אוזן; 21 March 1963 – 23 November 2009) was an Israeli footballer who played for Hapoel Be'er Sheva, Hapoel Tel Aviv and Tzafririm Holon.

Uzan began his career at Be'er Sheva during the 1980-81 season. In 1983, he was called up to the Israel national team's Olympics squad, playing a single match against Belgium. In 1984, he moved to Hapoel Tel Aviv, where he played until 1992. Between 1992 and 1994 he played for Tzafririm Holon.

In November 2009 Uzan was found dead in his car, it having crashed into a pole on Levi Eshkol Road in Beersheba. Police suspect that Uzan had been shot.
