= Marco Di Costanzo (footballer) =

Italian footballer (born 1973)

Personal information
- Date of birth: October 30, 1973 (age 52)
- Place of birth: Italy
- Position: Striker

Senior career*
Years	Team	Apps	(Gls)
–1995	OGC Nice	31	(2)
1995–1996	AC Reggiana 1919	15	(1)
1996–1997	US Triestina Calcio 1918	26	(4)
1997–1998	Stade Rennais FC	8	(1)
1998–1999	Hapoel Be'er Sheva FC	14	(3)
2000–2007	AS Cagnes Le Cros		
2007–2012	JS Saint-Jean Beaulieu		
- * Club domestic league appearances and goals

Marco Di Costanzo (born 30 October 1973) is an Italian former footballer.

== Early life ==
Di Costanzo was born in 1973 in Naples, Italy. He moved with his father to France at the age of seven.

== Career ==
Di Costanzo started his career with French Ligue 1 side OGC Nice. In 1995, he signed for Italian side AC Reggiana 1919. In 1996, he signed for Italian side US Triestina Calcio 1918. In 1997, he signed for French side Stade Rennais FC. In 1998, he signed for Israeli side Hapoel Be'er Sheva FC. In 2000, he signed for French side AS Cagnes Le Cros. In 2007, he signed for French side JS Saint-Jean Beaulieu.

== Style of play ==
Di Costanzo mainly operated as a striker. He was described as "delighted... with his swaying dribbles and his infernal rides".

== Personal life ==
After retiring from professional football, Di Costanzo worked in real estate. He owned an agency in Nice, France.
