= 1986 Israel Super Cup =

Hapoel Tel Aviv	Beitar Jerusalem
1	2
- Date: 16 September 1986
- Venue: Ramat Gan Stadium, Ramat Gan

The 1986 Israel Super Cup was the 16th Israel Super Cup (21st, including unofficial matches, as the competition wasn't played within the Israel Football Association in its first 5 editions, until 1969), an annual Israel football match played between the winners of the previous season's Top Division and Israel State Cup.

The match was played between Hapoel Tel Aviv, champions of the 1985–86 Liga Leumit and Beitar Jerusalem, winners of the 1985–86 Israel State Cup.

This was Hapoel's 7th Israel Super Cup appearance (including unofficial matches) and Beitar's 5th. At the match, played at Ramat Gan Stadium, Beitar Jerusalem won 2–1.

== Match details ==
16 September 1986

Hapoel Tel Aviv	1–2	Beitar Jerusalem
Landau 51'		Ohana; Malmilian

Ramat Gan Stadium, Ramat Gan
