= 1984–85 Liga Leumit =

Liga Leumit
- Season: 1984–85
- Champions: Maccabi Haifa; 2nd title
- Relegated: Beitar Tel Aviv; Hapoel Lod; Hakoah Ramat Gan
- Top goalscorer: David Lavi (18)

The 1984–85 Liga Leumit season saw Maccabi Haifa win the title. Beitar Tel Aviv, Hapoel Lod and Hakoah Ramat Gan were all relegated to Liga Artzit. David Lavi of Maccabi Netanya was the league's top scorer with 18 goals.

== Final table ==
Pos	Team	Pld	W	D	L	GF	GA	GD	Pts	Qualification or relegation
1	Maccabi Haifa (C)	30	20	5	5	57	20	+37	65	Qualification for the Intertoto Cup
2	Beitar Jerusalem	30	17	9	4	52	27	+25	60	Qualification for the Intertoto Cup
3	Shimshon Tel Aviv	30	13	10	7	29	20	+9	49	
4	Maccabi Petah Tikva	30	13	9	8	45	31	+14	48	
5	Hapoel Haifa	30	11	11	8	30	26	+4	44	
6	Hapoel Petah Tikva	30	11	10	9	30	27	+3	43	
7	Maccabi Tel Aviv	30	9	15	6	34	23	+11	42	
8	Maccabi Netanya	30	9	11	10	53	40	+13	38	
9	Hapoel Tel Aviv	30	9	11	10	31	32	−1	38	
10	Maccabi Yavne	30	8	12	10	34	38	−4	36	
11	Hapoel Kfar Saba	30	6	15	9	26	33	−7	33	
12	Maccabi Jaffa	30	8	9	13	30	40	−10	33	
13	Hapoel Be'er Sheva	30	6	14	10	26	30	−4	32	
14	Beitar Tel Aviv (R)	30	7	10	13	28	43	−15	31	Relegated to Liga Artzit
15	Hapoel Lod (R)	30	5	8	17	15	55	−40	23	Relegated to Liga Artzit
16	Hakoah Ramat Gan (R)	30	2	13	15	17	52	−35	19	Relegated to Liga Artzit

Source: rsssf.com
(C) Champions; (R) Relegated

== Results ==
Home \ Away	BEI	BTA	HAR	HBS	HHA	HKS	HLD	HPT	HTA	MHA	MJA	MNE	MPT	MTA	MYV	STA
Beitar Jerusalem	—	1–1	3–1	1–1	2–0	2–1	1–0	1–1	3–0	3–2	5–0	3–2	1–0	1–0	2–0	1–1
Beitar Tel Aviv	2–2	—	1–1	0–0	0–2	0–1	1–2	1–0	0–1	0–4	2–1	1–3	0–1	0–3	1–1	1–0
Hakoah Ramat Gan	0–4	1–4	—	1–0	0–1	1–2	1–1	1–1	1–1	2–2	1–1	1–1	1–0	1–2	0–0	0–1
Hapoel Be'er Sheva	2–1	2–1	3–0	—	1–2	0–0	1–1	1–0	2–2	0–0	1–1	1–1	1–2	2–2	0–0	2–1
Hapoel Haifa	1–3	2–2	0–0	1–0	—	0–0	2–0	2–0	3–0	0–1	2–1	0–0	2–5	1–1	3–1	1–0
Hapoel Kfar Saba	1–1	1–1	2–2	1–0	0–1	—	0–0	1–2	1–1	0–3	1–1	0–3	0–0	0–1	4–0	1–2
Hapoel Lod	0–3	0–1	1–0	0–0	1–1	2–0	—	0–2	0–0	1–0	0–1	0–9	1–1	2–1	0–0	0–1
Hapoel Petah Tikva	1–0	0–0	4–0	2–1	0–0	1–3	2–0	—	1–1	0–1	1–3	1–1	2–1	0–2	0–0	2–1
Hapoel Tel Aviv	1–2	1–1	4–0	1–0	2–0	1–1	3–0	0–1	—	0–1	0–1	0–0	1–1	0–3	2–1	0–0
Maccabi Haifa	2–0	0–1	5–0	2–0	0–0	5–1	2–0	2–0	3–2	—	2–1	4–0	1–2	0–0	3–1	3–1
Maccabi Jaffa	1–1	1–2	3–1	1–1	1–0	0–1	3–1	0–1	0–1	2–3	—	1–1	2–1	0–2	0–0	0–0
Maccabi Netanya	0–1	5–1	3–0	0–1	2–2	0–0	6–0	0–2	0–1	1–3	0–2	—	2–5	0–0	1–2	2–0
Maccabi Petah Tikva	0–1	2–1	2–0	1–1	0–0	1–1	3–1	1–1	2–3	1–0	3–1	2–3	—	1–0	3–1	1–1
Maccabi Tel Aviv	1–1	1–1	0–0	2–0	0–0	0–0	3–1	0–0	2–2	0–1	1–1	2–2	2–1	—	1–1	0–1
Maccabi Yavne	2–2	3–1	0–0	2–2	2–1	1–1	4–0	2–2	1–0	0–1	4–0	2–3	0–2	2–1	—	0–2
Shimshon Tel Aviv	3–0	1–0	0–0	1–0	1–0	1–1	3–0	1–0	1–0	1–1	1–0	2–2	0–0	1–1	0–1	—

Legend: Blue = home team win; Yellow = draw; Red = away team win.
