= Avi Cohen (footballer, born 1962) =

Israeli footballer

Personal information
- Full name: Avraham Cohen
- Date of birth: June 12, 1962 (age 64)
- Place of birth: Jerusalem, Israel
- Position: Right back

Senior career*
Years	Team	Apps	(Gls)
1979–1985	Beitar Jerusalem	86	(15)
1985–1986	Maccabi Sha'arayim	13	(1)
1986–1989	Beitar Jerusalem	83	(18)
1989–1995	Maccabi Tel Aviv	155	(39)
Total		337	(73)

International career
1987–1992	Israel	32	(3)
- * Club domestic league appearances and goals

Avraham "Avi" Cohen (Hebrew: אברהם "אבי" כהן; born 12 June 1962) is an Israeli former footballer who played as a right back. He is often referred as Avi Cohen II or Avi Cohen of Jerusalem to distinguish himself from the player of the same name, born in 1956.

== Career ==
Cohen began his career at Beitar Jerusalem, initially as a striker, but moved back to the right back position. Because of this, he was noted for his attacking skills, and was one of the first players in Israel to adopt the style of the attacking defender. He left Beitar in 1985 to join Maccabi Sha'arayim, but returned a season later. He would remain there until the summer of 1989, where he was signed by Maccabi Tel Aviv.

It was at Maccabi where he would be known as Avi Cohen of Jerusalem, as Avi Cohen became his teammate (albeit briefly, as he would leave to join Maccabi Netanya the following year). In his first two seasons, he scored three and six times respectively, but in the 1991–92 season, his goalscoring prowess really came to the fore. Maccabi won the title for the first time in twelve years, and Cohen scored twenty goals in all competitions (18 in the league, 2 in the State Cup), winning the Footballer of the Year award later that year. In the 1992–93 season, Maccabi would lose the title to Cohen's previous club, Beitar, but still won silverware, in the form of the Toto Cup. Cohen won the State Cup in 1994, the only trophy that had eluded him up to that point. He still maintained his better than average goal scoring total for a defender, with eight in all competitions. The following season, he won the title for the second time with Maccabi, but suffered a back injury and had to retire.

== International career ==
Due to his attacking style of play, he was a welcome addition to the Israel national football team, making 32 appearances and scoring three times.

== Honours ==
=== Club ===
Beitar Jerusalem

- Liga Leumit First Division (1): 1986–87
- State Cup (2): 1985, 1989

Maccabi Tel Aviv

- Liga Leumit First Division (2): 1991–92, 1994–95
- State Cup (1): 1994
- Toto Cup (1): 1993

=== Individual ===
- Israeli Player of the Year (1): 1992
