= Yigal Menahem =

Israeli footballer

Yigal Menahem יגאל מנחם
Personal information
- Full name: Yigal Menahem
- Date of birth: September 10, 1963 (age 63)
- Place of birth: Israel
- Position: Striker

Youth career
- Maccabi Netanya

Senior career*
Years	Team	Apps	(Gls)
1980–1982	Maccabi Netanya	13	(2)
1982–1983	Hapoel Kfar Saba	19	(0)
1983–1991	Maccabi Netanya	213	(65)
1991–1992	Hapoel Jerusalem	14	(2)
1992–1993	Beitar Netanya	9	(0)

International career
1987–1989	Israel	5	(1)
- * Club domestic league appearances and goals

Yigal Menahem (Hebrew: יגאל מנחם; born 10 September 1963) is an Israeli former footballer who now works as a lawyer.

== Personal life ==
Yigal's younger brother Shimon was a defender and both played together in Maccabi Netanya during the 1980s.

== Honours ==
- Israeli Premier League runner-up: 1981–82
- League Cup/Toto Cup winner: 1983–84
  - runner-up: 1986–87, 1988–89
