= 1988–89 Israel State Cup =

Tournament details
- Country: Israel

Final positions
- Champions: Beitar Jerusalem (5th title)
- Runners-up: Maccabi Haifa

The 1988–89 Israel State Cup (Hebrew: גביע המדינה, Gvia HaMedina) was the 50th season of Israel's nationwide football cup competition and the 35th after the Israeli Declaration of Independence.

The competition was won by Beitar Jerusalem who have beaten Maccabi Haifa 4–3 on penalties after 3–3 in the final.

== Format Changes ==
Starting with this edition, the ties, not including the semi-finals and the final, are to be played as two-legged ties.

== Results ==
=== Round of 16 ===
Team 1	Agg.	Team 2	1st leg	2nd leg
Shimshon Tel Aviv	1–0	Maccabi Tel Aviv	0–0	1–0
Beitar Jerusalem	5–2	Hapoel Tel Aviv	0–2	5–0
Hapoel Petah Tikva	3–3 (a)	Hapoel Kfar Saba	1–1	2–2
Hapoel Be'er Sheva	5–0	Hapoel Ramat Gan	4–0	1–0
Hapoel Tiberias	5–3	Maccabi Netanya	3–1	2–2
Hapoel Tzafririm Holon	1–0	Bnei Yehuda	0–0	1–0
Maccabi Haifa	3–2	Hapoel Beit She'an	0–1	3–1
Beitar Tel Aviv	5–1	Maccabi Shikun HaMizrah	0–0	5–1

=== Quarter-finals ===
Team 1	Agg.	Team 2	1st leg	2nd leg
Shimshon Tel Aviv	0–0 (4–1 p)	Hapoel Tiberias	0–0	0–0
Maccabi Haifa	3–1	Hapoel Be'er Sheva	1–1	2–0
Beitar Tel Aviv	1–1 (a)	Hapoel Petah Tikva	0–0	1–1
Beitar Jerusalem	6–0	Hapoel Tzafririm Holon	1–0	5–0

=== Semi-finals ===
Home team	Score	Away team
Beitar Jerusalem	1–0	Beitar Tel Aviv
Maccabi Haifa	1–1, replay: 3–1	Shimshon Tel Aviv

=== Final ===
14 June 1989

Maccabi Haifa	3–3 (a.e.t.)	Beitar Jerusalem
Atar 13', 100'; Mizrahi 90'		Malmilian 48'; Cohen 73', 92'
Penalties
	3–4

Ramat Gan Stadium
Attendance: 35000
Referee: Tzvi
