= Eli Ohana =

Israeli footballer (born 1964)

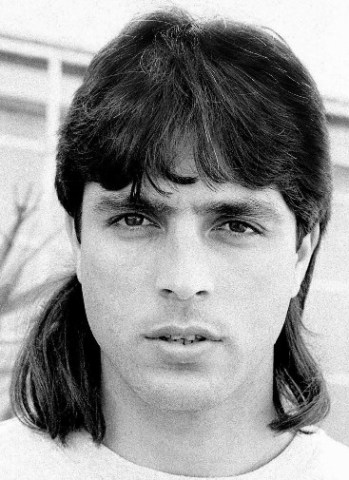
- Ohana in 1991

Personal information
- Full name: Eliyahu Ohana
- Date of birth: 1 February 1964 (age 62)
- Place of birth: Jerusalem
- Positions: Striker; second striker; attacking midfielder

Team information
- Current team: Beitar Jerusalem (chairman; 2017–2022)

Senior career*
| Years | Team | Apps | (Gls) |
| 1980–1987 | Beitar Jerusalem | 172 | (70) |
| 1987–1990 | Mechelen | 52 | (10) |
| 1990–1991 | Braga | 25 | (3) |
| 1991–1999 | Beitar Jerusalem | 172 | (82) |
| Total | | 421 | (165) |

International career^{‡}
| 1984–1997 | Israel | 50 | (17) |

Managerial career
- 1999–2000: Beitar Jerusalem
- 2000–2001: Bnei Yehuda Tel Aviv
- 2001: Maccabi Petah Tikva
- 2001–2003: Bnei Yehuda Tel Aviv
- 2003–2005: Beitar Jerusalem
- 2006–2008: Hapoel Kfar Saba
- 2008–2016: Israel U19
- 2010: Israel (interim)
- * Club domestic league appearances and goals as of 9 July 2006 ‡ National team caps and goals as of 23 October 2026

Medal record

Representing Israel

Association football (soccer)

Maccabiah Games
| Bronze medal – third place | 1981 Maccabiah | Footballer |

Eliyahu "Eli" Ohana (Hebrew: אליהו "אלי" אוחנה; born 1 February 1964) is an Israeli former professional footballer and the former chairman of Israeli club Beitar Jerusalem. He played as a forward or attacking midfielder for Beitar Jerusalem, KV Mechelen, S.C. Braga, and the Israel national football team, who is considered one of Israel's finest footballers, occasionally was dubbed "King Ohana" by fans and local news outlets. He managed Beitar Jerusalem, Bnei Yehuda Tel Aviv, Maccabi Petah Tikva, Hapoel Kfar Saba, the Israel national under-19 football team, the seniors' Israel national football team (interim). He also played for Team Israel at the 1981 Maccabiah Games, winning a bronze medal.

== Early and personal life ==
Ohana was born and raised in Jerusalem, Israel, to an Israeli family of both Sephardi Jewish and Mizrahi Jewish (Moroccan-Jewish) descent, who had immigrated to Israel in 1955, and resided in the Jerusalemite neighbourhood of Kiryat HaYovel. Prior to Ohana's birth, his family initially resided in a ma'abara within the city of Haifa, Israel, and then moved to the northern city of Kiryat Shmona, Israel. Ohana has seven brothers and two sisters, one of whom is from his father's previous marriage. They struggled with financial issues back then. His younger brother is the former footballer Zion Ohana.

At age 11, Ohana joined the youth academy of Israeli club of Beitar Jerusalem at the encouragement of his brother Yossi Ohana. His father, a Masorti Jew, was initially opposed but allowed him to join on the condition that he attends synagogue before practice every Saturday (Shabbat).

Although great on the field, Ohana had difficulties at school and his brother Yossi advised him to choose between football and school. Ohana who has chosen football, was then invited to reside along with his brother Yossi and his newlywed wife.

In 1982, Ohana's girlfriend Sarit Schwarz died in a car accident. Her death drove Ohana into depression and social seclusion. In December 1991, he married Israeli model Ronit Ben-Basat, with whom he had a son, Tom. They separated in 2004, without filing for divorce.

== Club career ==
In 1977, Ohana led the youth league team of Beitar Jerusalem to the state youth title. He stood out for his ability to find the back of the net and was promoted to first team. Beitar played in the second league (Artzit) at the time. Although Ohana did not do well in his first matches, he and Uri Malmilian later pushed the club into the first league (Leumit), and helped to bring the club its first league title and two Israel State Cups.

In 1986, Ohana joined Australian club Sydney City on a short-term loan, in which he played five matches.

At age 23, Ohana signed with KV Mechelen in Belgium. (The money from the Ohana sale paid for the Bayit VeGan pitches used since then for the team practice.) After one season, Ohana was instrumental in the club winning the UEFA Cup Winners' Cup, becoming the first Israeli soccer player to win a European title. His goal in the semi-final and his assist on the game-winning goal in the final secured his place in Mechelen's history books. Italian magazine Guerin' Sportivo awarded Ohana the Bravo Award, which is given to the best player under 23 in European competition. Ohana also took part in the testimonial match to Oleg Blokhin.

Despite his success in Europe, Ohana returned home to sign again with Beitar, which was then playing in the Liga Artzit (Nationwide League). After one season, Ohana helped them return to the Liga Leumit (National League) and then guided the club to a league title. Five years later, Ohana led the club to back-to-back league titles. After an injury in the 7th game of the 1997/98 season, Ohana did not play any more that season. He played some games in 1998/99 but retired before the end of the season.

In the youth team of Beitar he played under number 9, in Mechelen under 10, in Beitar Jerusalem under 11.

=== International career ===
Ohana played for Team Israel at the 1981 Maccabiah Games, winning a bronze medal. He was called up to the Israel national football team in 1983. After a friendly match in which Israel lost to Argentina 7–2, Diego Maradona said there is one great player in Israel, Eli Ohana.

Ohana secured himself a place in Israeli football history when the national team was in a crucial FIFA World Cup qualifier against Australia in 1989. Australia manager Frank Arok apparently had made antisemitic comments before the game. During the match, Ohana dribbled through two defenders and fooled the keeper, giving Israel a 1–0 lead. Ohana then ran up to the Australian manager and kissed the Star of David in front him.

In 1990 Ohana was called to the squad for a game against the Soviet Union national football team. Minutes before the game began, Ohana and the two other legionnaires of the Israeli team, Ronny Rosenthal and Shalom Tikva, realized that their insurance had not been arranged as promised, and they refused to go onto the pitch. All the players were punished, with Ohana receiving the worst punishment, banned from 10 league games and banned for four years from the national team.

In 1995/1996 Ohana had a weak season and decided to quit international football. The Uruguay national football team was invited to Israel for his testimonial match, which Israel won 3–1 with Ohana scoring the first goal.

In 1996–97 Ohana had an excellent season (he was chosen player of the year at the end of it) and Shlomo Sharf returned him to the team, with Ohana again scoring often.

=== Managerial career ===
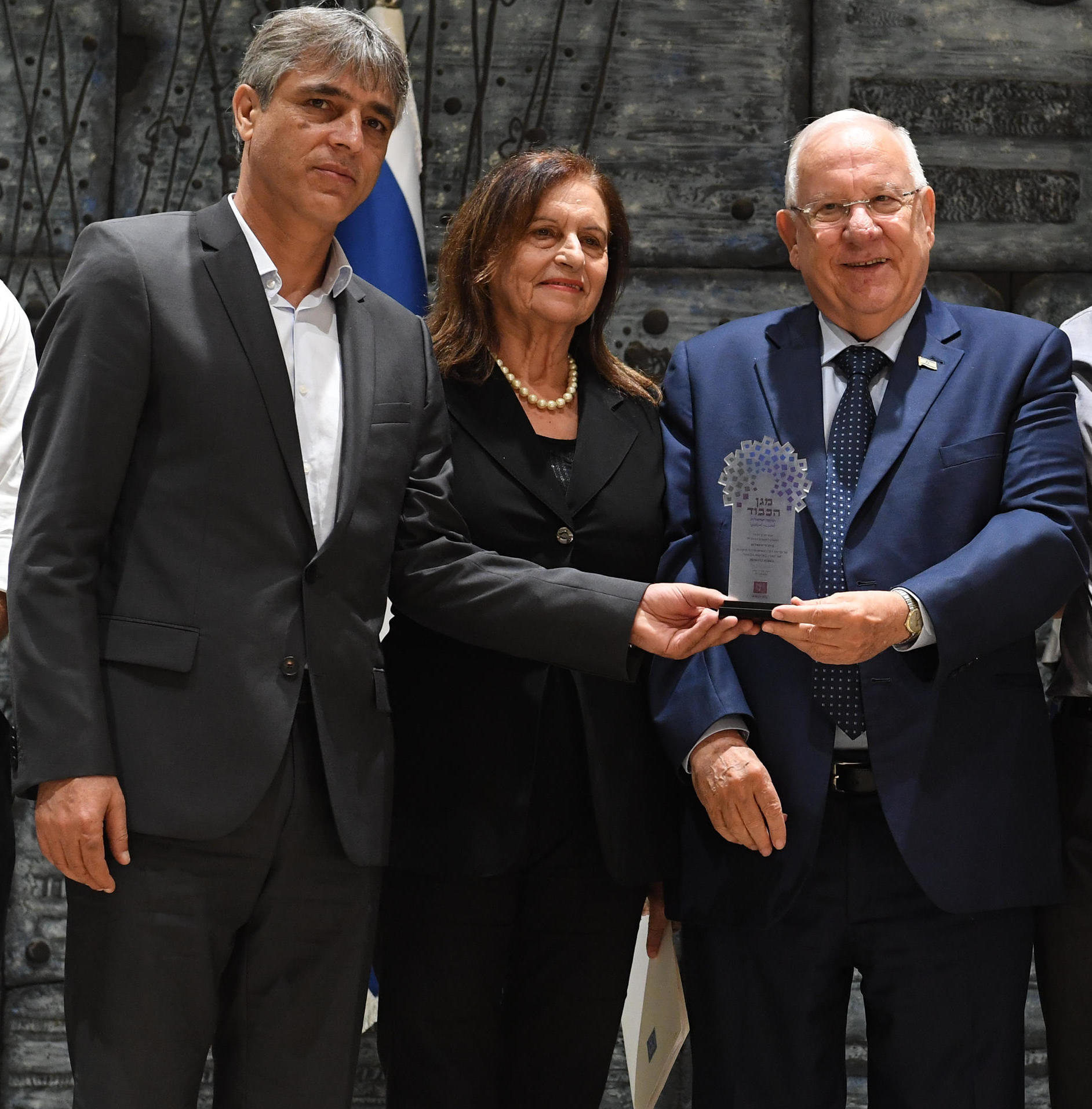
Ohana (left) with Israeli president Reuven Rivlin (right) in 2017

His managerial career started during his last playing season, when he served as an assistant to Dror Kashtan. After retiring, he was promoted to manager, replacing Kashtan. After leading his childhood club to a sixth place league finish and cup final, he left for Bnei Yehuda Tel Aviv but resigned after they were relegated to the Liga Leumit. After seven matches in charge of Maccabi Petah Tikva in 2001, he was fired and rejoined Bnei Yehuda, the club he had led to relegation the year before. This time he was able to guide them to a return to the Israeli Premier League.

The next season, he was able to keep the team from being relegated again. Calls came from fans of Beitar Jerusalem to bring Ohana back; he returned before the 2003–2004 season and stayed for three seasons. He stepped down as manager when the club was sold to Arcadi Gaydamak. He returned to management with Hapoel Kfar Saba and saved them from relegation, for which he earned Coach of the Year.

At the end of 2007-08 Israeli Premier League Ohana was relegated with Hapoel Kfar Saba to Liga Leumit despite their having won the last game of the season.

On 18 June 2008 Ohana was appointed manager for Israel U19.

In 2010, Dror Kashtan, the coach of the Israel national football team quit from his position, and Ohana was made the caretaker. With Ohana on the lines, Israel beat Romania 2–0 in a friendly match. That game started rumours Ohana would become the new head coach, but Ohana said in an interview his time was yet to come.

== International goals ==
| No. | Date | Venue | Opponent | Score | Result | Competition |
|---|---|---|---|---|---|---|
| 1. | 4 April 1984 | Bloomfield Stadium, Tel Aviv, Israel | Republic of Ireland | 1–0 | 3–0 | Friendly |
| 2. | 9 October 1984 | Olympic Stadium, Athens, Greece | Greece | 2–1 | 2–2 | Friendly |
| 3. | 21 November 1984 | Petah Tikva Municipal Stadium, Petah Tikva, Israel | Romania | 1–0 | 1–1 | Friendly |
| 4. | 19 December 1984 | Petah Tikva Municipal Stadium, Petah Tikva, Israel | Luxembourg | 2–0 | 2–0 | Friendly |
| 5. | 1 May 1985 | Ramat Gan Stadium, Ramat Gan, Israel | Sweden | 1–1 | 1–1 | Friendly |
| 6. | 8 September 1985 | Ramat Gan Stadium, Ramat Gan, Israel | Chinese Taipei | 3–0 | 5–0 | 1986 FIFA World Cup qualification |
| 7. | 8 September 1985 | Ramat Gan Stadium, Ramat Gan, Israel | Chinese Taipei | 4–0 | 5–0 | 1986 FIFA World Cup qualification |
| 8. | 8 September 1985 | Ramat Gan Stadium, Ramat Gan, Israel | Chinese Taipei | 5–0 | 5–0 | 1986 FIFA World Cup qualification |
| 9. | 26 February 1986 | Ramat Gan Stadium, Ramat Gan, Israel | England | 1–0 | 1–2 | Friendly |
| 10. | 19 March 1989 | Ramat Gan Stadium, Ramat Gan, Israel | Australia | 1–0 | 1–1 | 1990 FIFA World Cup qualification |
| 11. | 16 April 1989 | Sydney Football Stadium, Sydney, Australia | Australia | 1–0 | 1–1 | 1990 FIFA World Cup qualification |
| 12. | 23 February 1994 | Yud-Alef Stadium, Ashdod, Israel | Georgia | 1–0 | 2–0 | Friendly |
| 13. | 23 February 1994 | Yud-Alef Stadium, Ashdod, Israel | Georgia | 2–0 | 2–0 | Friendly |
| 14. | 20 September 1995 | Teddy Stadium, Jerusalem, Israel | Uruguay | 1–0 | 3–1 | Friendly |
| 15. | 15 December 1996 | Ramat Gan Stadium, Ramat Gan, Israel | Luxembourg | 1–0 | 1–0 | 1998 FIFA World Cup qualification |
| 16. | 30 April 1997 | Ramat Gan Stadium, Ramat Gan, Israel | Cyprus | 1–0 | 2–0 | 1998 FIFA World Cup qualification |
| 17. | 30 April 1997 | Ramat Gan Stadium, Ramat Gan, Israel | Cyprus | 2–0 | 2–0 | 1998 FIFA World Cup qualification |

== Political career ==
Some of his friends are well-known politicians of the right-wing Likud party (Benjamin Netanyahu, Reuven Rivlin), and thus he attended the bar mitzvah celebrations of the son of the Likud party leader in their mutual hometown of Jerusalem, Israel.

Ahead of the 2015 elections, Naftali Bennett, the head the right-wing religious Zionist Jewish Home party, placed Ohana on position number ten of his party's election list. After three days of harsh criticism from party members who were displeased by Bennett's choice of an outsider who did not match the party's right-wing character, Ohana withdrew "after being asked to do so by minister Bennett".

== Honours ==
=== Player ===
Beitar Jerusalem

- Israeli championship: 1986–87, 1992–93, 1996–97, 1997–98
- Israel State Cup: 1984–85, 1985–86
- Toto Cup Top Division: 1997–98
- Israel Super Cup: 1986

KV Mechelen

- Belgian First Division: 1988–89
- European Cup Winners Cup: 1987–88 (winners)
- European Super Cup: 1988
- Amsterdam Tournament: 1989
- Joan Gamper Trophy: 1989
- Jules Pappaert Cup: 1990

Individual

- Bravo Award: 1988
- Israeli Footballer of the Year: Israeli player of the Year: 1984, 1997
- Member of the Israeli Football Hall of Fame

=== Manager ===
- Israeli Head Coach of the Year: 2007

== See also ==
- List of Jewish footballers
- List of Jews in sports
- List of Israelis
- List of Israel international footballers
- List of Israeli top-flight league players with 100 or more goals
- List of Jews in sports (non-players)
