= 1985–86 Israel State Cup =

Tournament details
- Country: Israel

Final positions
- Champions: Beitar Jerusalem (4th title)
- Runners-up: Shimshon Tel Aviv

The 1985–86 Israel State Cup (Hebrew: גביע המדינה, Gvia HaMedina) was the 47th season of Israel's nationwide football cup competition and the 32nd after the Israeli Declaration of Independence.

The competition was won by Beitar Jerusalem who have beaten Shimshon Tel Aviv 2–1 in the final.

== Results ==
=== Round of 16 ===
Home team	Score	Away team
Hapoel Tel Aviv	1–2	Maccabi Haifa
Shimshon Tel Aviv	2–2, replay: 2–1	Maccabi Jaffa
Hapoel Be'er Sheva	1–1, replay: 1–0	Maccabi Netanya
Hapoel Kfar Saba	2–1	Beitar Netanya
Maccabi Petah Tikva	1–0	Hapoel Jerusalem
Beitar Jerusalem	1–0	Hapoel Haifa
Maccabi Hadera	2–2, replay: 1–0	Hapoel Petah Tikva
Maccabi Yavne	0–0, replay: 1–2	Maccabi Tel Aviv

=== Quarter-finals ===
Home team	Score	Away team
Maccabi Haifa	2–3	Beitar Jerusalem
Maccabi Hadera	2–0	Hapoel Kfar Saba
Hapoel Be'er Sheva	1–2	Shimshon Tel Aviv
Maccabi Tel Aviv	1–1, replay: 2–2, 5–4 p.	Maccabi Petah Tikva

=== Semi-finals ===
Home team	Score	Away team
Shimshon Tel Aviv	4–0	Maccabi Hadera
Beitar Jerusalem	2–1	Maccabi Tel Aviv

=== Final ===
27 May 1986

Beitar Jerusalem	2–1 (a.e.t.)	Shimshon Tel Aviv
Ohana 61'; Malmilian 104'		Arbiv 81'

Ramat Gan Stadium
Attendance: 18000
Referee: Tilinger
