= 1984–85 Israel State Cup =

Tournament details
- Country: Israel

Final positions
- Champions: Beitar Jerusalem (3rd title)
- Runners-up: Maccabi Haifa

The 1984–85 Israel State Cup (Hebrew: גביע המדינה, Gvia HaMedina) was the 46th season of Israel's nationwide football cup competition and the 31st after the Israeli Declaration of Independence.

The competition was won by Beitar Jerusalem who have beaten Maccabi Haifa 1–0 in the final.

== Results ==
=== Sixth Round ===
Home team	Score	Away team
Maccabi Sha'arayim	0–1	Hapoel Ramat Gan
Hapoel Yehud	2–1 (a.e.t.)	Hapoel Hadera
Hapoel Holon	4–0	Hapoel Tiberias
Maccabi Ramat Amidar	1–0	Beitar Kiryat Shmona
Hapoel Jerusalem	2–0	Hapoel Yokneam
Hapoel Kiryat Shmona	0–0 (a.e.t.), replay: 1–0	Beitar Netanya
Hapoel Ramat HaSharon	1–1 (a.e.t.), replay: 1–0	Beitar Haifa
Hapoel Merhavim	0–2	Hapoel Rishon LeZion
Hapoel Beit Shemesh	1–0	Maccabi Shefa-'Amr
Maccabi Hadera	1–0	Hapoel Yeruham
Maccabi Or Akiva	3–1	Hapoel Azor
Hapoel Or Yehuda	1–1 (a.e.t.), replay: 0–1	Beitar Ramla
Maccabi Dror Lod	0–9	Hapoel Marmorek
Hapoel Kiryat Ono	2–1	Hapoel Ashkelon
Hapoel Tel Hanan	0–4	Bnei Yehuda
Hapoel Aliyah Kfar Saba	1–1 (a.e.t.), replay: 1–2	Maccabi Ramla

=== Seventh Round ===
Home team	Score	Away team
Beitar Jerusalem	1–0	Hapoel Holon
Hapoel Haifa	2–0	Hapoel Kiryat Shmona
Maccabi Or Akiva	0–4	Hapoel Be'er Sheva
Hakoah Maccabi Ramat Gan	3–1	Hapoel Jerusalem
Hapoel Beit Shemesh	2–4 (a.e.t.)	Maccabi Tel Aviv
Beitar Tel Aviv	5–0	Maccabi Ramla
Bnei Yehuda	1–2	Maccabi Jaffa
Maccabi Netanya	3–1 (a.e.t.)	Maccabi Ramat Amidar
Hapoel Kiryat Ono	0–0 (a.e.t.), replay: 1–0	Hapoel Lod
Hapoel Kfar Saba	4–3	Hapoel Rishon LeZion
Maccabi Hadera	0–2	Hapoel Petah Tikva
Hapoel Ramat Gan	0–1	Maccabi Petah Tikva
Maccabi Haifa	2–0	Hapoel Yehud
Hapoel Marmorek	0–1	Hapoel Tel Aviv
Shimshon Tel Aviv	1–1 (a.e.t.), replay: 3–0	Beitar Ramla
Hapoel Ramat HaSharon	3–6	Maccabi Yavne

=== Round of 16 ===
Home team	Score	Away team
Hapoel Petah Tikva	2–1	Hapoel Tel Aviv
Shimshon Tel Aviv	1–0	Hapoel Haifa
Hapoel Kiryat Ono	1–0	Maccabi Netanya
Hapoel Kfar Saba	4–2	Hapoel Be'er Sheva
Maccabi Petah Tikva	2–1	Maccabi Jaffa
Beitar Jerusalem	3–2	Maccabi Yavne
Beitar Tel Aviv	5–2	Hakoah Maccabi Ramat Gan
Maccabi Haifa	1–0	Maccabi Tel Aviv

=== Quarter-finals ===
Home team	Score	Away team
Hapoel Kiryat Ono	1–4	Beitar Jerusalem
Maccabi Haifa	2–0	Beitar Tel Aviv
Maccabi Petah Tikva	3–0	Shimshon Tel Aviv
Hapoel Petah Tikva	0–2	Hapoel Kfar Saba

=== Semi-finals ===
Home team	Score	Away team
Maccabi Haifa	1–0	Hapoel Kfar Saba
Beitar Jerusalem	3–3 (a.e.t.) 5–4 p.	Maccabi Petah Tikva

=== Final ===
4 June 1985

Beitar Jerusalem	1–0	Maccabi Haifa
Ohana 85'

Ramat Gan Stadium
Attendance: 30000
Referee: Ben Itzhak
