= Shimshon Tel Aviv F.C. =

Israeli football club

Shimshon Tel Aviv
- Full name: Shimshon Tel Aviv Football Club מועדון כדורגל שמשון תל אביב
- Founded: 1949; 2014 (Refounded)
- Ground: Northern Sportech Ground, Tel Aviv
- Owner: Roey Ovadia
- Manager: Hay Abayev
- League: Liga Alef South
- 2024–25: Liga Alef South, 10th of 16
Home colours	Away colours

Shimshon Tel Aviv F.C. (Hebrew: מועדון כדורגל שמשון תל אביב, Moadon Kaduregel Shimshon Tel Aviv) is an Israeli football club based in Tel Aviv.

In 2000 it merged with Beitar Tel Aviv to create Beitar Shimshon Tel Aviv. In 2011, the merge came apart after Beitar Tel Aviv merged with Ironi Ramla to create Beitar Tel Aviv Ramla, whilst Shimshon withdrew from the union and functioned as youth section, without a senior team.

In 2014, the club was resurrected by local businessmen. On 11 September 2014 Shimshom beat Hapoel Ramat Gan 1–0 in a historic first win in 10 years.

== History ==
A chart showing the progress of Shimshon Tel Aviv through the Israeli football league system, from 1949–50 to the present

The club was formed in memory of Shimshon Rouzi, a former Maccabi Tel Aviv player who died in the 1948 Arab-Israeli War. It was commonly referred to as the club of Kerem HaTeimanim, a neighbourhood of Tel Aviv.

The club spent its first few years in the lower leagues, before winning promotion to the top flight (then called Liga Leumit) in 1960 as Liga Alef champions.

In 1962–63 the Shimshon finished 4th, the club's highest position to date. In 1965–66, Shimshon player Moshe Romano was the division's joint top scorer alongside Maccabi Netanya's prolific striker Mordechai Spiegler, with 17 goals. The club also made their first appearance in a State Cup final, going down 2–1 to Hapoel Haifa.

Another 4th-place finish was achieved in 1969–70, with Romano again finishing as the league's top scorer. The following season they went one better by finishing second to champions Maccabi Netanya. However, the success was not sustained, and a season after finishing second, the club narrowly avoided relegation, finishing one place above the drop zone. The 1972–73 was even worse, as the club was relegated alongside Hapoel Marmorek.

Despite their setback the previous season, Shimshon had a successful season in 1973–74, finishing second in Liga Alef North and took part in the new promotion/relegation play-offs. They finished second in the play-off group, and were promoted back to Liga Leumit.

The early 1980s were a period of relative success, as the club finished third in 1979–80 and 1984–85, and another second-place finish achieved in 1982–83. A second cup final was reached in 1986, but they lost 2–1 to Beitar Jerusalem. In 1987–88 the club qualified for the Intertoto Cup.

Although they reached another cup final in 1989–90, losing again, 1–0 after extra time to Hapoel Kfar Saba, the club finished bottom of Liga Leumit for the first time in their history, and were relegated to Liga Artzit (the second tier since the 1976). Unable to bounce back to the top flight, and overshadowed by more popular and successful teams in Tel Aviv (Hapoel, Maccabi and Bnei Yehuda, the club merged with fellow Tel Aviv strugglers Beitar to form Beitar Shimshon Tel Aviv.

In 2014, the club returned to the map of Israeli football after 14 years.

== Current squad ==
As to 24 July 2025

No.	Pos.	Nation	Player
1	GK	ISR	Ran Haspia
2	DF	ISR	Guy Nof
3	DF	ISR	Aviv Shetter
4	DF	ISR	Rotem Baruch
5	DF	ISR	Ilay Shafiki
7	MF	ISR	Ronen Gerdashov
9	FW	ISR	Rani Nof
11	MF	ISR	Omer Sulimani
12	DF	ISR	Daniel Oknin
13	MF	ISR	Ilay Matzfi
14	MF	ISR	Itamar Dayan
15	FW	ISR	Tomer Barzilay

No.	Pos.	Nation	Player
17	MF	ISR	Roei Levi
20	MF	ISR	Yam Amar
21	DF	ISR	Ilay Rotem
22	GK	ISR	Yarden Hershenzon
25	MF	ISR	Yuval Dabul
—	DF	ISR	Dor Alberman
—	DF	ISR	Sahar Revivo
—	DF	ISR	Assaf Simantov
—	MF	ISR	Kachal Yosef
—	MF	ISR	Ben Reichert
—	FW	ISR	Eden Hershkovitz
—	FW	ISR	Idan Vaknin

== Honours ==
- Israeli Premier League
  - Runners-up 1970–71, 1982–83
- Israeli Second Division
  - Champions 1959–60
- Toto Cup
  - Winners 1986–87, 1987–88
- Israel State Cup
  - Runners-up 1966, 1986, 1990

== Notable players ==
Internationally capped players

- (Israel) Pini Balili
- (Israel) Eli Cohen
- (Israel) Gidi Damti
- (Israel) Ya'akov Hodorov
- (Israel) Adoram Keisi
- (Israel) Vicky Peretz
- (Israel) Moshe Romano
