= Maccabi Jaffa F.C. =

Israeli football club

Maccabi Jaffa
- Full name: Maccabi Jaffa Football Club
- Nickname: The Bulgarians
- Founded: 1949; 2008 (Refounded)
- Dissolved: 2000
- Ground: Bloomfield Stadium, Tel Aviv
- Capacity: 29,400
- Owners: Fan-owned
- Chairman: Ilan Krautz
- Manager: Itzik Baruch
- League: Liga Leumit
- 2025–26: Liga Leumit, 9th of 16
- Website: https://maccabi-jaffa.com/
Home colours	Away colours

Maccabi Kabilio Jaffa Football Club (Hebrew: מועדון כדורגל מכבי קביליו יפו) is an Israeli football club from Jaffa, Tel Aviv. Founded in 2007 as a phoenix football club by fans of Maccabi Jaffa F.C., which was dissolved in 2000 and all previous attempts in the intervening years to revive it were unsuccessful.

The team played for 32 seasons in the Israeli Top Division, though its only title was The Israeli Toto Cup for the Second Division. Maccabi Jaffa finished three times at the second place in the Israeli First Division (in the seasons of 1962, 1964 and 1977). In 1957, Maccabi Jaffa played at the final of the Israeli State Cup, but lost to Hapoel Petah Tikva.

The club disbanded in 2000. In 2007, the club refounded as Maccabi Kabilio Jaffa was founded by their fans after 7 years of other unsuccessful attempts to revive the club.

== History ==
A chart showing the progress of Maccabi Jaffa through the Israeli football league system, from 1949–50 to the present

=== The early years ===
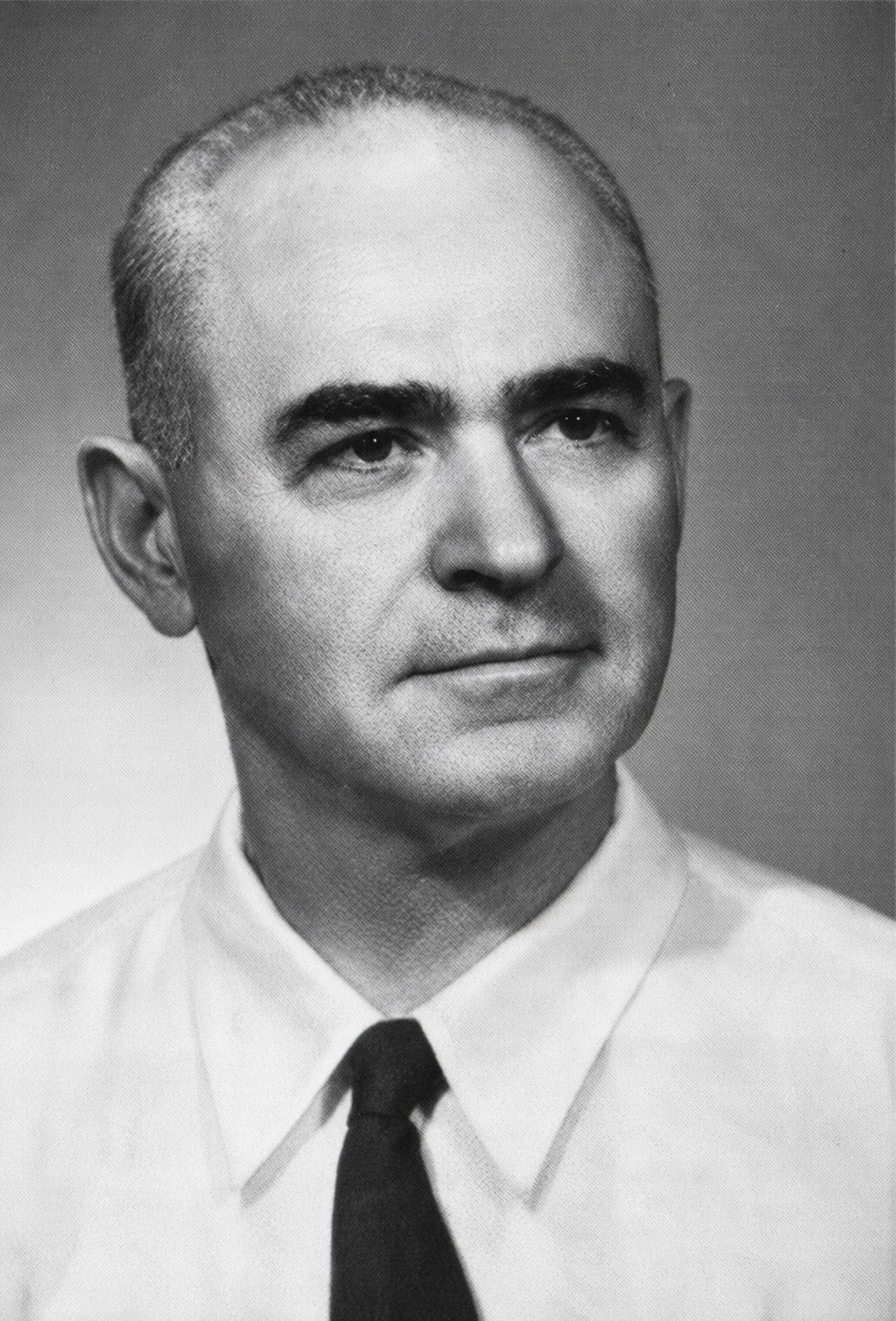
Albert Kiyosso, the founder of the "Zionist association of Maccabi Jaffa"

Zionist association of Maccabi Jaffa was founded in 1949 by Albert Kiyosso (1898–1963), the chairman of Maccabi Bulgaria organization who immigrated to Mandatory Palestine from Bulgaria in 1943. The club was originally composed chiefly of Bulgarian Jewish immigrants to Jaffa. In the early 1950s, the members received a surface of abandoned orchard due to lack of funds, the members qualified the surface by themselves and built the club's stadium which was nicknamed "The Tins Stadium." In the season of 1954–1955 Maccabi Jaffa played in the promotion play-offs for the Israeli top division with Hapoel Kfar-Saba, Hapoel Kiryat Haim, and Beitar Jerusalem. Jaffa won the Play-offs and promoted for the first time to the Israeli major league.

During the 1950s Maccabi Jaffa was struggling in the bottom part of the Israeli First Division. The peak of this period was in the season of 1956–1957 when Maccabi Jaffa participated in the final of The Israeli State Cup, though they lost 2–1 to Hapoel Petah Tikva.

=== The 1960s ===
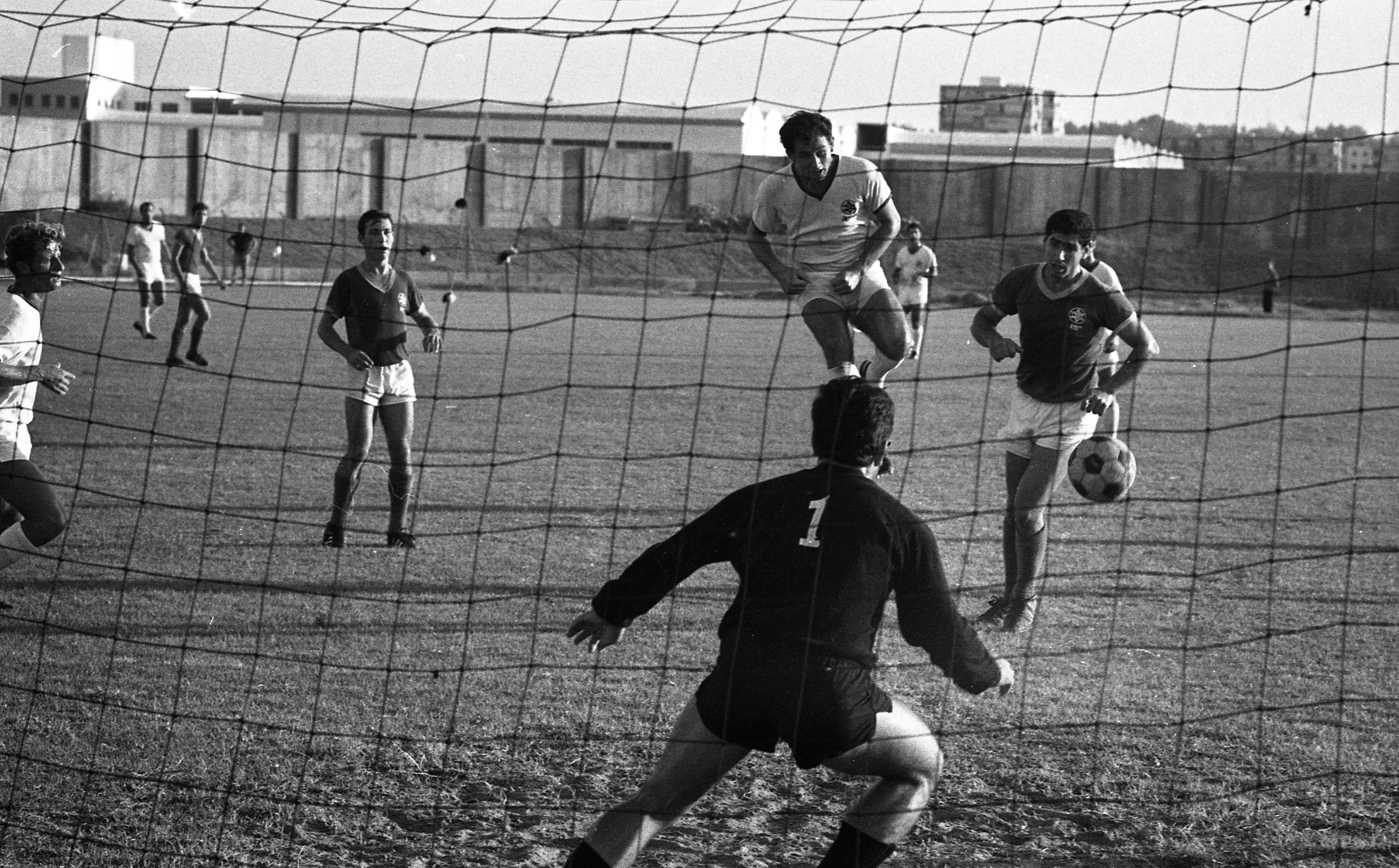
Soccer game between Maccabi jaffa (dark shirts) and Maccabi Haifa, 1969

In the 1960s, Maccabi Jaffa was close twice to win the championship.

In the Season of 1961–1962 Maccabi Jaffa, coached by Vasil Spasov finished second in the Israeli Major League, only 2 points from the champions, Hapoel Petah Tikva.

The season of 1963–1964 considered the best season of Maccabi Jaffa history. In this season Maccabi Jaffa fought the championship against Hapoel Ramat Gan. In the games between the teams, Jaffa had won 3–1 in Ramat Gan, and 1–0 in Jaffa, but that wasn't enough. Ramat Gan won the Championship, only 1 point above Maccabi Jaffa. In that season, Maccabi Jaffa striker Israel Ashkenazi was Israel's top scorer with 21 goals.

In the late 1960s, Jaffa failed to show the same quality as in their top years, and in the season of 1969–1970 Maccabi Jaffa finished in the 15th position, and was relegated to the second division, after 14 years in the top division.

=== The 1970s ===
Maccabi Jaffa had started the 1970s in the second division. In the season of 1970–1971 Maccabi Jaffa got their revenge in Hapoel Ramat Gan, after winning 1–0 in the last game of the season in Jaffa, and promoting back to the top division at the expense of Hapoel Ramat Gan.

The rest of the 1970s, Jaffa was a mediocre team in the Israeli first division. The only season worth mentioning is 1976–1977. in this year, Jaffa was once again close to be the champions. Jaffa finished in the second place, after Maccabi Tel Aviv, that's after Jaffa beat Maccabi Tel Aviv in both games of that season.

=== The 1980s ===
Jaffa's first season in the 1980s was promising, as the team finished in the third place, but from there everything went wrong.

Jaffa became a bottom league team, until in the season of 1986–1987, when Jaffa finished in the 15th place and was relegated to the second division after 16 successive years in the first division.

Jaffa did not succeed to promote to the first division in the 1980s, and finished the next seasons in mid-table of Liga Artzit, the second division at the time.

=== The 1990s ===
The first years of the 1990s seem good for Maccabi Jaffa. In the season of 1991–1992 Jaffa finished in the sixth place, but won their first title ever: Israeli Toto Cup of the Liga Artzit.

Jaffa won the Toto Cup of Liga Artzit again in the next season, and finished in fourth place, which earned the team a promotion play-off against Hapoel Petah Tikva, who finished in the 14th place in the first division. Jaffa lost 1–2 and 0–3 and remained in the second division.

In the season of 1994–1995 Jaffa finished in the first place, and promoted to the first division after 8 years in the second division.

The season of 1995–1996 was not good for The Bulgarians, as Jaffa finished in the bottom place and relegated back to the second division after only one season.

Jaffa came back to life in the season of 1997–1998. That season is considered one of the best in the club's history. The team finished the league in the first place, with only one lose (to Maccabi Kiryat Gat). Jaffa's striker Ofir Haim was the top scorer of the season with 26 goals. Moreover, Jaffa won the Toto Cup of Liga Artzit for the third time.

The season of 1998–1999 was the 32 and last season of Maccabi Jaffa in Israel's top division. That season was the worst in Jaffa's history and one of the worst in Israel's top division history. Jaffa finished the season in the bottom place, with 2 wins, 4 ties and 24 losses (10 points out of 90). In spite of the poor season, Maccabi Jaffa beat Maccabi Haifa 1–0 in the 29th game and denied Maccabi Haifa a spot in next season's UEFA Cup.

Jaffa started the season of 1999–2000 in the second division, but after only one game (in which they won 1–0 against Tzafririm Holon), The club was demoted by the Israel Football Association to the fourth division for violation of the budget rules. Because Jaffa got in deep debts, The club changed its name to Maccabi Jaffa 2000 and finished the season in the 9th place. At the end of the season, the club was dissolved after failing to comply with arbitrator decisions and fielding ineligible player.

=== Maccabi Kabilio Jaffa ===
The dissolved club merged with Ramat Eliyahu S.C., where most of the club players left for Ramat Eliyahu S.C. played at Gaon Stadium and used Maccabi Jaffa's crest.

The "new" Maccabi Jaffa, Ramat Eliyahu S.C., targeted to promotion to the third division, but failed consistently.

In the season of 2006–2007 the team finished in the second bottom place and relegated to the fifth division. During the years, the club merged with the clubs Tzeirei Jaffa, Hatzrot Jaffa and Bnei Jaffa and in 2008 became S.C. Bnei Jaffa. Following that, the club no longer played in Maccabi Jaffa's Stadium, and no longer played with Maccabi Jaffa's logo.

Before the beginning of the 2008–09 season, some of Maccabi Jaffa's old fans gathered and reestablished the team under the name Maccabi Kabilio Jaffa; the team is being called after its goalkeeper in the 1970s Herzl Kabilio who died from cancer at the age of 35. The club is a fan's club, and gains its money from the donations made by the fans. The team was registered for the 2008–09 season for the bottom league in Israel, Liga Gimel.

Maccabi Kabilio Jaffa's symbol (2007–2022)

== History ==
Before the beginning of the 2008–09 season, some of Maccabi Jaffa's old fans gathered and reestablished the team under the name Maccabi Kabilio Jaffa (the team is being called after its goalkeeper in the 1970s Herzl Kabilio who died from cancer at the age of 35). The club is a fan's club, and gains its money from the donations made by the fans. The team was registered for the 2008–09 season for the bottom league in Israel, Liga Gimel.

In that season, Jaffa won the Israeli State Cup for Liga Gimel, and finished in the first place of the Tel Aviv division, with only one loss. Jaffa played the promotion game against Ironi Beit Dagan in Bloomfield Stadium in front of 9,000 fans.

Jaffa played in Liga Bet in the season of 2009–10. in this season Jaffa made history when they became the first club from Liga Bet, since 1963, to reach the Round of 16 of the Israeli State Cup. In the way to this phase, Jaffa won against Hapoel Hadera from Liga Alef and Ironi Kiryat Shmona which won the second division in that season. In the Round of 16 to the Final, Jaffa lost 0–5 to Hapoel Tel Aviv, which eventually went to win both the State Cup and the Premier League in that season.

During the season, Jaffa won the Israeli State Cup for Liga Bet, and finished the season in the first place with no losses. Maccabi Kabilio Jaffa was the only team in Israel, which was undefeated during the entire 2009–10 season.

Jaffa started its third season in Liga Alef, the third league in Israel. In this season, Jaffa broke their winning sequence, when they lost to Maccabi Ironi Netivot in Netivot. The loss came after 65 consecutive games without a loss, the longest period of time in which an Israeli team played without losing.

Jaffa finished the season in fourth place and qualified for the promotion play-offs. After beating Bnei Eilat, Maccabi Kiryat Malakhi and Asi Gilboa in the Liga Alef play-offs, Jaffa faced the 14th placed in 2010–11 Liga Leumit, Hakoah Ramat Gan. Jaffa lost the first leg in their home stadium in Holon by a result of 1–2, and the second leg in Ramat Gan ended in 1–1 draw. Thus, Maccabi Kabilio Jaffa remained in Liga Alef.

Jaffa finished as runners-up for third successive seasons, in 2011–12, 2012–13 and 2013–14. However, they failed to achieve promotion to Liga Leumit, after losing to Beitar Kfar Saba in the first round of the promotion play-offs, in 2012–13 and 2013–14.

In the 2014–15 season, Jaffa surprisingly found itself in the battle against relegation and finished in the 14th place. However, they survived in Liga Alef, after beating the Liga Bet South play-offs winner, Hapoel Kiryat Ono, by a result of 2–0, in the Relegation play-offs.

Maccabi Kabilio Jaffa steadied themselves in the Liga Alef South division. The 2015–16 season was their sixth consecutive in that league but in later years they were promoted to the Liga Leumit, Israel's second league, where they play today (2025).

== Current squad ==
As of 4 April 2026

No.	Pos.	Nation	Player
1	GK	ISR	Roy Baranes
3	DF	ISR	Roy Levi
5	MF	ISR	Haim Mekonen
6	MF	ISR	Amit Meir
7	FW	ISR	Dor Jan
8	MF	ISR	Dolev Balulu
9	FW	ISR	Guy Itzhaki
10	MF	ISR	Itay Zada
11	DF	ISR	Adir Maya
12	DF	ISR	Dan Sirkis
13	DF	ISR	Ilay Nachum

No.	Pos.	Nation	Player
14	MF	ISR	Sagi Israeli
15	MF	ISR	Sagiv Elbaz
17	MF	ISR	Noam Amzaleg
18	GK	ISR	Harel Atia
19	MF	ISR	Ron Talmi
23	DF	CMR	Hamza Hamidou
34	MF	CRO	Goran Antonić
36	FW	ISR	Shimon Daniel
66	FW	ISR	Ilay Mori
87	DF	ISR	Rani Ze'evi

== Honours ==
- Second tier
  - Champions 1954–55, 1970–71, 1994–95, 1997–98
- Toto Cup Artzit
  - Winners 1991–92, 1992–93, 1997–98
- Third tier
  - Champions 2021–22
- Fourth tier
  - Champions 2009–10
- Sixth tier
  - Champions 2008–09
