= 1978 Israel Super Cup =

Maccabi Netanya	Beitar Jerusalem
4	0
- Date: 23 September 1978
- Venue: HaKufsa, Netanya
- Referee: Zvi Sharir
- Attendance: 5,000

The 1978 Israel Super Cup was the eighth Israel Super Cup (13th, including unofficial matches, as the competition wasn't played within the Israel Football Association in its first 5 editions, until 1969), an annual Israel football match played between the winners of the previous season's Top Division and Israel State Cup.

The match was played between Maccabi Netanya, champions of the 1977–78 Liga Leumit and Beitar Jerusalem, runners-up in the league, as Maccabi Netanya won the 1977–78 Israel State Cup.

This was Maccabi Netanya's 3rd Israel Super Cup appearance and Beitar's Second. At the match, played at Maccabi Netanya Stadium, Maccabi Netanya won 4–0.

== Match details ==
23 September 1978
15:00

Maccabi Netanya	4–0	Beitar Jerusalem
Gariani 10'; Halfon 25'; G. Machnes 70' (pen.), 84' (pen.)

HaKufsa, Netanya
Attendance: 5,000
Referee: Zvi Sharir

Maccabi Netanya	Beitar Jerusalem

GK	(Israel) Itzhak Vissoker
RB	(Israel) Baruch Hassan
CB	Israel Hajaj (c)
CB	(Israel) Haim Bar
LB	(Israel) Gad Machnes
CM	(Israel) Mordechai Halfon
CM	(Israel) Gabi Rosendoren
CM	(Israel) Albert Gazal	Substituted off
FW	(Israel) Oded Machnes
FW	(Israel) David Lavi	Substituted off
FW	(Israel) Moshe Gariani
Substitutes:
MF	(Israel) Gideon Kleinman	Substituted in
FW	(Israel) Eli Bargig	Substituted in
Manager:
(Israel) Shmulik Perlman

GK	(Israel) Yossi Mizrahi
RB	(Israel) Yossi Hacham	Substituted off
DF	(Israel) Itzhak Jano
DF	(Israel) Shlomo Kirat
LB	(Israel) Yarkoni
DM	(Israel) Hanan Azulai
CM	(Israel) Yadid	Substituted off
CM	(Israel) Uri Malmilian
FW	(Israel) Danny Noyman
FW	(Israel) Eli Miali
FW	(Israel) Yossi Avrahami
Substitutes:
MF	(Israel) Shlomi Malka	Substituted in
DF	(Israel) Schwarz	Substituted in
Manager:
(Israel) Shimon Shenhar
