= 1983 Israel Super Cup =

Maccabi Netaya	Hapoel Tel Aviv
1	0
- Date: 14 June 1983
- Venue: Ramat Gan Stadium, Ramat Gan
- Referee: Arie Prost
- Attendance: 1,500

The 1983 Israel Super Cup was the 13th Israel Super Cup (18th, including unofficial matches, as the competition wasn't played within the Israel Football Association in its first 5 editions, until 1969), an annual Israel football match played between the winners of the previous season's Top Division and Israel State Cup.

The match was played between Maccabi Netanya, champions of the 1982–83 Liga Leumit and Hapoel Tel Aviv, winners of the 1982–83 Israel State Cup.

This was Maccabi Netanya's 5th Israel Super Cup appearance and Hapoel Tel Aviv's 6th (including unofficial matches). At the match, played at Ramat Gan Stadium, Maccabi Netanya won 1–0.

== Match details ==
14 June 1983

Maccabi Netanya	1–0	Hapoel Tel Aviv
Lam 60'

Ramat Gan Stadium, Ramat Gan
Attendance: 1,500
Referee: Arie Prost

Maccabi Netanya	Hapoel Tel Aviv

GK	(Israel) Arie Alter
RB	(Israel) Gad Machnes	Substituted off
CB	(Israel) Haim Bar (c)
CB	(Israel) Baruch Hassan
LB	(Israel) Shlomo Shirazi
RM	(Israel) Motti Halfon
CM	(Israel) Danny Etzioni
CM	(Israel) Ronen Gabay	Substituted off
LM	(Israel) Benny Lam
FW	(Israel) David Lavi
FW	(Israel) Moshe Gariani
Substitutes:
DF	(Israel) Shimon Menachem	Substituted in
MF	(Israel) David Pizanti	Substituted in
Manager:
(Israel) Mordechai Spiegler

GK	(Israel) Ya'akov Bitran
RB	(Israel) Rami Arama
DF	(Israel) Meir Nahmias
DF	(Israel) Benny Cohen
LB	(Israel) Nissim Halfon	Substituted off
RM	(Israel) Arie Meir
CM	(Israel) Shabtai Yachbas
CM	(Israel) Moris Zano
LM	(Israel) Rafi Shmuel	Substituted off
FW	(Israel) Dov Remler
FW	(Israel) Gili Landau
Substitutes:
DF	(Israel) Nimni	Substituted in
MF	(Israel) Laustein	Substituted in
Manager:
(Israel) Zvi Rosen
