= 1980 Israel Super Cup =

Maccabi Netanya	Hapoel Kfar Saba
2	1
- Date: 30 August 1980
- Venue: Hapoel Kfar Saba Ground, Kfar Saba
- Referee: Naftali Eitan
- Attendance: 2,000

The 1980 Israel Super Cup was the tenth Israel Super Cup (15th, including unofficial matches, as the competition wasn't played within the Israel Football Association in its first 5 editions, until 1969), an annual Israel football match played between the winners of the previous season's Top Division and Israel State Cup.

The match was played between Maccabi Netanya, champions of the 1979–80 Liga Leumit and Hapoel Kfar Saba, winners of the 1979–80 Israel State Cup.

This was Maccabi Netanya's 4th Israel Super Cup appearance and Hapoel Kfar Saba's second. At the match, played at Kfar Saba, Maccabi Netanya won 2–1.

== Match details ==
30 August 1980

Maccabi Netanya	2–1	Hapoel Kfar Saba
Lavi 6'; Shirazi 32'		Weitzmann 9'

Hapoel Kfar Saba ground, Kfar Saba
Attendance: 2,000
Referee: Naftali Eitan

Maccabi Netanya	Hapoel Kfar Saba

GK
RB
CB
CB
LB
CM
CM
CM
FW
FW
FW
Substitutes:
MF
Manager:
(Israel) Ya'akov Grundman

(Israel) Roni Glaubermann
(Israel) Baruch Hassan
(Israel) Gideon Kleinman	Booked
(Israel) Haim Bar (c)
(Israel) David Pizanti
(Israel) Victor Boni
(Israel) Benny Lam
(Israel) Motti Halfon
(Israel) Oded Machnes
(Israel) David Lavi
(Israel) Shlomo Shirazi	Substituted off
(Israel) Zvi Tzemah	Substituted in

GK	(Israel) Ya'akov Schwarz
RB	(Israel) Yigal Hillel
DF	(Israel) Itzhak Shum
DF	(Israel) Itzhak Na'aman
LB	(Israel) Noah Einstein	Booked
CM	(Israel) Dori Almog
CM	(Israel) Ariel Ben Arie
CM	(Israel) Avner Golasa		Substituted off
FW	(Israel) Shlomo Weitzmann
FW	(Israel) Itzhak Maimoni	Booked
FW	Israel Fogel		Substituted off
Substitutes:
MF	(Israel) Elu Fuss		Substituted in
FW	(Israel) Gideon Simon		Substituted in
Manager:
(Israel) Avraham Marchinski
