= Benyamin Lam =

Israeli footballer and manager

Benyamin Lam בנימין לם
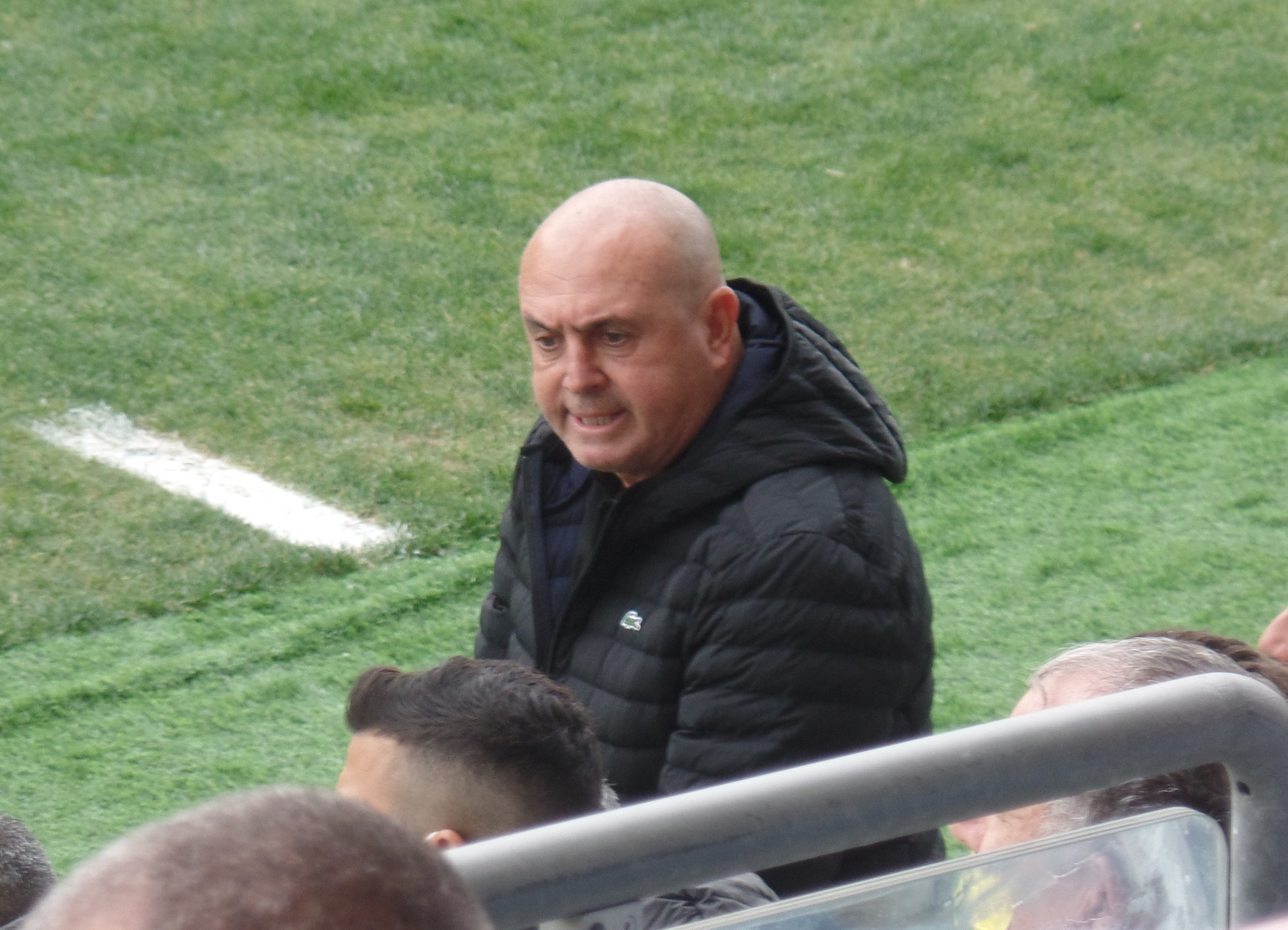

Personal information
- Full name: Benyamin "Benny" Lam
- Date of birth: April 9, 1959 (age 67)
- Place of birth: Netanya, Israel
- Position: Midfielder

Youth career
- Maccabi Netanya

Senior career*
Years	Team	Apps	(Gls)
1978–1990	Maccabi Netanya	322	(72)
1990–1992	Hapoel Ashdod	46	(14)
1992	Maccabi Sha'arayim	5	(2)
1992–1994	Hapoel Tayibe	28	(8)

International career
1980–1981	Israel	2	(0)

Managerial career
- 1995: Maccabi Netanya
- 1996–1997: Hapoel Tayibe
- 1996–2007: Beitar Nes Tubruk (youth)
- 2007–2009: Maccabi Netanya (youth general manager)
- 2007–2009: Israel (beach)
- 2010: Maccabi Ironi Kfar Yona
- 2010–2017: Israel (beach)
- 2011–2014: Maccabi Netanya (youth general manager)
- 2014–2017: Maccabi Netanya (youth)
- 2017–2019: Beitar Nes Tubruk (youth)
- 2019–2021: Maccabi Haifa (youth)
- 2021–2022: Maccabi Netanya
- 2022–2024: Maccabi Petah Tikva
- 2024: Hapoel Petah Tikva
- * Club domestic league appearances and goals

Benny Lam (Hebrew: בנימין "בני" לם; born 9 April 1959) is a former Israeli footballer and manager.

== Honours ==
=== National ===
- Israeli Premier League (3):
  - 1977–78, 1979–80, 1982–83
- Israeli Supercup (2):
  - 1980, 1983
- League Cup (2):
  - 1982, 1983

=== International ===
- UEFA Intertoto Cup (2):
  - 1980, 1983

=== National ===
- Israeli Noar Premier League (2):
  - 2019–20, 2020–21
- Liga Leumit (1):
  - 2022–23

== Managerial stats ==
As of 11 May 2024

Team	Nat	From	To	Record				
Team	Nat	From	To	P	W	D	L	Win %
Maccabi Netanya	(Israel)	June 1995	October 1995	7	1	3	3	14.29
Hapoel Tayibe	(Israel)	December 1996	January 1997	2	0	0	2	0.00
Maccabi Ironi Kfar Yona	(Israel)	December 31, 2009	July 19, 2010	18	5	5	8	27.78
Maccabi Netanya	(Israel)	October 3, 2021	November 6, 2022	44	16	13	15	36.36
Maccabi Petah Tikva	(Israel)	December 26, 2022	January 2, 2024	40	18	8	14	45.00
Hapoel Petah Tikva	(Israel)	February 12, 2024		12	2	5	5	16.67
Total				123	42	34	47	34.15
