= Mordechai Spiegler =

Israeli footballer (born 1944)

Mordechai Spiegler מרדכי שפיגלר
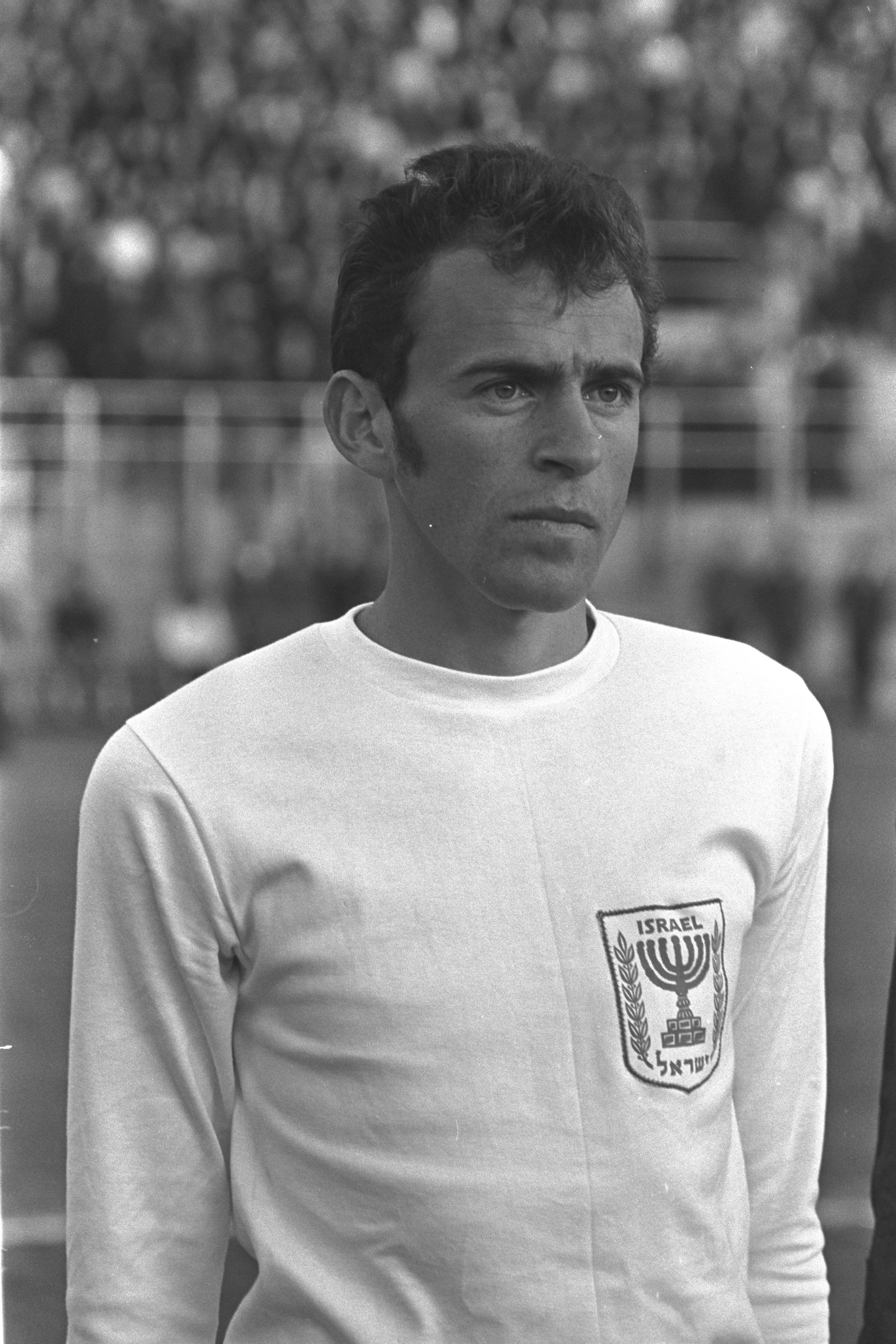
- Spiegler in 1970

Personal information
- Date of birth: 19 August 1944 (age 82)
- Place of birth: Asbest, Russian SFSR, USSR
- Height: 5 ft 10 in (1.78 m)
- Position: Striker

Youth career
- 1957–1961: Maccabi Netanya

Senior career*
Years	Team	Apps	(Gls)
1961–1972	Maccabi Netanya	301	(196)
1972–1973	RC Paris	39	(11)
1973–1974	Paris Saint-Germain	13	(10)
1974–1975	Maccabi Netanya	26	(5)
1975	New York Cosmos	17	(6)
1975–1978	Maccabi Netanya	61	(11)
1978–1979	Hapoel Haifa	20	(1)
1981–1982	Beitar Tel Aviv (player-manager)	15	(2)
Total		492	(252)

International career
1963–1977	Israel	83	(32)

Managerial career
- 1979: Maccabi Haifa
- 1979–1980: Hapoel Haifa
- 1980–1982: Beitar Tel Aviv
- 1982–1984: Maccabi Netanya
- 1984: Hapoel Tel Aviv
- 1985: Maccabi Jaffa
- 1990–1992: Maccabi Netanya
- 1994–1996: Tzafririm Holon
- 2013: Maccabi Netanya (general manager)
- * Club domestic league appearances and goals

Mordechai "Motaleh" Spiegler (Hebrew: מרדכי "מוטל'ה" שפיגלר; born 19 August 1944) is an Israeli retired football player and manager. A prolific forward, he is placed second in Israel's all time goalscoring list, with 32 goals in 83 caps.

== Early life ==
Mordechai Spiegler was born in Asbest, Soviet Russia, and is Jewish. He immigrated to Netanya, Israel, when he was a boy.

== Club career ==
As a striker, he played for Maccabi Netanya along with Paris Saint Germain in France and alongside Pelé for New York Cosmos of the North American Soccer League in the 1970s.

He was chosen as the Israeli Player of the Year a record four times, in 1967–68, 1968–69, 1969–70, and in 1970–71.

== International career ==
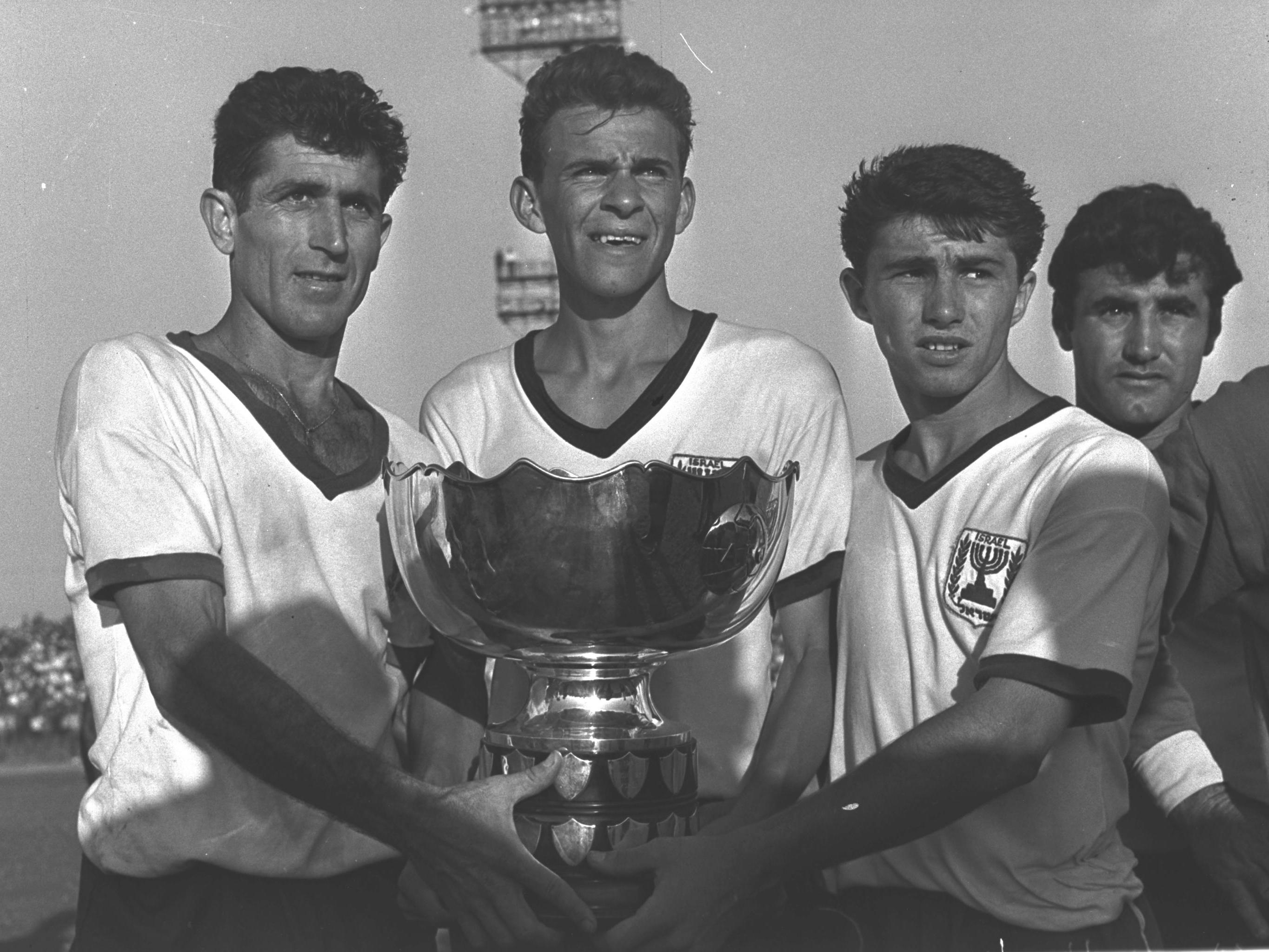
Israeli teammates (Spiegler in the middle) holding the 1964 AFC Asian Cup after beating South Korea in the final round

Spiegler made his international debut for Israel on 2 January 1964 against Hong Kong. He appeared in the Israeli win in the 1964 AFC Asian Cup, and scored two goals at the tournament, which made him a joint tournament top scorer.

His major achievement was helping Israel qualify for the 1970 FIFA World Cup in Mexico. He scored Israel's lone goal in World Cup history in a 1–1 draw against Sweden.

His 32 goals for the national team (according to IFA count, FIFA counts only 24 of them) was the Israeli record up until 2021 when he was surpassed by Eran Zahavi. Spiegler scored 24 goals in 62 'official' internationals for the Israel national side, he also played in 21 other 'unofficial' matches (mostly Olympic Games qualifiers) scoring eight more goals.

Spiegler captained the Israel Olympic team at Mexico City 1968 that reached the quarter-finals, losing to Bulgaria by a draw, 1–1.

== Post-playing career ==
Spiegler was nominated as the best Israeli player of the prior 50 years by the Israel Football Association in the UEFA Jubilee Awards in November 2003. He is a member of the Education and Publicity Committee of the IFA.

In 2007, he won a lifetime contributions special award for the Israeli national team in the 1970 FIFA World Cup, determined by Yedioth Ahronoth and the Israeli football player association.

== Career statistics ==
=== Club ===
Appearances and goals by club, season and competition
Club	Season	League		
Club	Season	Division	Apps	Goals
Maccabi Netanya	1960–61	Liga Leumit	14	5
Maccabi Netanya	1961–62	Liga Leumit	17	5
Maccabi Netanya	1962–63	Liga Alef	28	23
Maccabi Netanya	1963–64	Liga Alef	22	24
Maccabi Netanya	1964–65	Liga Leumit	27	16
Maccabi Netanya	1965–66	Liga Leumit	30	17
Maccabi Netanya	1966–68	Liga Leumit	54	38
Maccabi Netanya	1968–69	Liga Leumit	25	26
Maccabi Netanya	1969–70	Liga Leumit	30	12
Maccabi Netanya	1970–71	Liga Leumit	30	13
Maccabi Netanya	1971–72	Liga Leumit	24	17
Maccabi Netanya	Total		301	196
Paris FC	1972–73	Division 1	39	11
Paris Saint-Germain	1973–74	Division 2	13	10
Maccabi Netanya	1974–75	Liga Leumit	26	5
New York Cosmos	1975	NASL	17	6
Maccabi Netanya	1975–76	Liga Leumit	32	5
Maccabi Netanya	1976–77	Liga Leumit	26	5
Maccabi Netanya	1977–78	Liga Leumit	3	1
Maccabi Netanya	Total		61	11
Hapoel Haifa	1978–79	Liga Leumit	20	1
Beitar Tel Aviv	1981–82	Liga Leumit	15	2
Career total			492	242

=== International ===
Appearances and goals by national team and year
National team	Year	Apps	Goals
Israel	1963	1	0
Israel	1964	8	4
Israel	1965	5	0
Israel	1966	8	4
Israel	1967	1	0
Israel	1968	14	15
Israel	1969	10	3
Israel	1970	8	3
Israel	1971	5	1
Israel	1972	6	1
Israel	1973	6	1
Israel	1974	0	0
Israel	1975	0	0
Israel	1976	3	0
Israel	1977	8	0
Total		83	32

Scores and results list Israel's goal tally first, score column indicates score after each Spiegler goal.

List of international goals scored by Mordechai Spiegler
No.	Date	Venue	Opponent	Score	Result	Competition
1	2 January 1964	Government Stadium, Wan Chai, Hong Kong	Hong Kong	2–0	3–0	Friendly
2	26 May 1964	Ramat Gan Stadium, Ramat Gan, Israel	Hong Kong	1–0	1–0	1964 AFC Asian Cup
3	29 May 1964	Bloomfield Stadium, Tel Aviv, Israel	India	1–0	2–0	1964 AFC Asian Cup
4	28 November 1964	Bloomfield Stadium, Tel Aviv, Israel	Yugoslavia	1–0	2–0	Friendly
5	6 April 1966	Bloomfield Stadium, Tel Aviv, Israel	Finland	3–1	7–1	Friendly
6	6 April 1966	Bloomfield Stadium, Tel Aviv, Israel	Finland	6–1	7–1	Friendly
7	15 June 1966	Ramat Gan Stadium, Ramat Gan, Israel	Uruguay	1–1	1–2	Friendly
8	12 October 1966	Bloomfield Stadium, Tel Aviv, Israel	Yugoslavia	1–1	1–3	Friendly
9	14 February 1968	Bloomfield Stadium, Tel Aviv, Israel	Switzerland	1–0	2–1	Friendly
10	14 February 1968	Bloomfield Stadium, Tel Aviv, Israel	Switzerland	2–1	2–1	Friendly
11	17 March 1968	Bloomfield Stadium, Tel Aviv, Israel	Ceylon	2–0	7–0	1968 Summer Olympics qualification
12	17 March 1968	Bloomfield Stadium, Tel Aviv, Israel	Ceylon	5–0	7–0	1968 Summer Olympics qualification
13	17 March 1968	Bloomfield Stadium, Tel Aviv, Israel	Ceylon	7–0	7–0	1968 Summer Olympics qualification
14	12 May 1968	Amjadieh Stadium, Tehran, Iran	Hong Kong	1–0	6–1	1968 AFC Asian Cup
15	12 May 1968	Amjadieh Stadium, Tehran, Iran	Hong Kong	5–0	6–1	1968 AFC Asian Cup
16	10 September 1968	Bloomfield Stadium, Tel Aviv, Israel	Northern Ireland	1–3	2–3	Friendly
17	15 September 1968	Yankee Stadium, New York City, United States	United States	1–0	3–3	Friendly
18	15 September 1968	Yankee Stadium, New York City, United States	United States	2–0	3–3	Friendly
19	25 September 1968	Temple Stadium, Philadelphia, United States	United States	1–0	4–0	Friendly
20	25 September 1968	Temple Stadium, Philadelphia, United States	United States	2–0	4–0	Friendly
21	25 September 1968	Temple Stadium, Philadelphia, United States	United States	3–0	4–0	Friendly
22	25 September 1968	Temple Stadium, Philadelphia, United States	United States	4–0	4–0	Friendly
23	15 October 1968	Estadio Nou Camp, León, Mexico	El Salvador	2–1	3–1	1968 Summer Olympics
24	28 September 1969	Ramat Gan Stadium, Ramat Gan, Israel	New Zealand	1–0	4–0	1970 FIFA World Cup qualification
25	1 October 1969	Ramat Gan Stadium, Ramat Gan, Israel	New Zealand	1–0	2–0	1970 FIFA World Cup qualification
26	14 December 1969	Sydney Sports Ground, Sydney, Australia	Australia	1–0	1–1	1970 FIFA World Cup qualification
27	22 March 1970	Addis Ababa Stadium, Addis Ababa, Ethiopia	Ethiopia	3–0	5–1	Friendly
28	22 March 1970	Addis Ababa Stadium, Addis Ababa, Ethiopia	Ethiopia	4–0	5–1	Friendly
29	7 June 1970	Estadio Luis Dosal, Toluca, Mexico	Sweden	1–1	1–1	1970 FIFA World Cup
30	11 November 1971	Lang Park, Brisbane, Australia	Australia	2–1	2–2	Friendly
31	28 March 1972	Bogyoke Aung San Stadium, Yangon, Burma	India	1–0	1–0	1972 Summer Olympics qualification
32	21 May 1973	Dongdaemun Stadium, Seoul, South Korea	Thailand	2–0	6–0	1974 FIFA World Cup qualification

== Managerial statistics ==
Team	Nat.	From	To	Record				
Team	Nat.	From	To	M	W	D	L	Win %
Maccabi Haifa	(Israel)	1979	1979	3	0	0	3	0.00
Hapoel Haifa	(Israel)	1979	1980	30	8	11	11	26.67
Beitar Tel Aviv	(Israel)	1980	1982	65	28	21	16	43.08
Maccabi Netanya	(Israel)	1982	1984	80	44	17	19	55.00
Hapoel Tel Aviv	(Israel)	1984	1984	8	1	3	4	12.50
Maccabi Jaffa	(Israel)	1985	1985	12	5	5	2	41.67
Maccabi Netanya	(Israel)	1990	1992	86	27	26	33	31.40
Tzafririm Holon	(Israel)	1994	1996	55	19	9	27	34.55
Total				339	132	92	115	38.94

== Honours ==
=== Player ===
Maccabi Netanya

- Israeli Premier League: 1970–71, 1977–78
- Israel State Cup: 1977–78
- Israeli Supercup: 1971, 1978

Israel

- AFC Youth Championship: 1964
- AFC Asian Cup: 1964

Individual

- Israeli Premier League top goalscorer: 1965–66, 1966–68, 1968–69
- Israeli Player of the Year: 1965–66, 1968–69, 1969–70, 1970–71
- Member of the Israeli Football Hall of Fame

=== Manager ===
Beitar Tel Aviv

- Second Division:1980–81

Maccabi Netanya

- Israeli Premier League: 1982–83
- Israeli Supercup: 1983
- UEFA Intertoto Cup: 1983, 1984
- League Cup: 1982, 1983

== See also ==
- List of Ligue 1 hat-tricks
- List of Jews in sports
