= 1982 Lilian Cup =

1982 League Cup

Tournament details
- Country: Israel
- Dates: 4–15 September 1982
- Teams: 4

Final positions
- Champions: Maccabi Netanya
- Runner-up: Hapoel Be'er Sheva

Tournament statistics
- Matches played: 8
- Goals scored: 32 (4 per match)
- Top goal scorer(s): Oded Machnes; David Lavi (4)

The 1982 Lilian Cup was the 1st season of the competition. The four top placed teams for the previous season took part in the competition.

The competition was held in two stages. First, the four teams played a round-robin tournament, after which the two top teams played for the cup, while the bottom teams played for the third place. The competition was held between 4 September and 15 September 1982. This was the first league competition in Israel to award three points for a victory.

The competition was won by Maccabi Netanya, who had beaten Hapoel Be'er Sheva 3–1 in the final.

== Group stage ==
The matches were played from 4 September to 11 November 1982.

Pos	Team	Pld	W	D	L	GF	GA	GD	Pts	Qualification
1	Maccabi Netanya	3	2	1	0	12	4	+8	7	Advance to the final
2	Hapoel Be'er Sheva	3	1	2	0	7	5	+2	5	Advance to the final
3	Bnei Yehuda	3	0	2	1	3	10	−7	2	3rd-4th place playoff
4	Hapoel Kfar Saba	3	0	1	2	5	8	−3	1	3rd-4th place playoff

Rules for classification: 1st points; 2nd goal difference; 3rd matches won; 4th goals scored; 5th head-to-head; 6th decision match

4 September 1982 Round 1	Maccabi Netanya	3–2	Hapoel Kfar Saba	Netanya
16:00	Lavi 52'; Gariani 66'; Lam 83'	Report (in Hebrew)	Revivo 5'; Maimoni 22'	Stadium: HaKufsa; Attendance: 2500; Referee: Arie Frost

4 September 1982 Round 1	Bnei Yehuda	1–1	Hapoel Be'er Sheva	Tel Aviv
15:30	Ben Tuvim 22'	Report (in Hebrew)	Weitzman 77'	Stadium: Hatikva Neighborhood Stadium; Attendance: 1000; Referee: Itzhak Ben Itzhak

7 September 1982 Round 2	Maccabi Netanya	7–0	Bnei Yehuda	Netanya
	Lavi 11', 26'; O. Machnes 17', 71', 86'; Lam 31', 53'	Report (in Hebrew)		Stadium: HaKufsa; Attendance: 2000; Referee: Yair Tilinger

7 September 1982 Round 2	Hapoel Kfar Saba	2–4	Hapoel Be'er Sheva	Kfar Saba
	Maimoni 4'; Fogel 40'	Report (in Hebrew)	Alush 12', 55'; Weitzman 18'; Abugzir 40'	Stadium: Hapoel Kfar Saba ground Attendance: 500; Referee: Yosef Diamant

11 September 1982 Round 3	Hapoel Be'er Sheva	2–2	Maccabi Netanya	Be'er Sheva
	Avitan 49'; Davidi 61'	Report (in Hebrew)	Pizanti 26'; Machnes 58'	Stadium: Vassermil Stadium; Attendance: 4000; Referee: Ovadia Ben Itzhak

11 September 1982 Round 3	Bnei Yehuda	1–1	Hapoel Kfar Saba	Tel Aviv
	Ben Tuvim 79'	Report (in Hebrew)	Fogel 63'	Stadium: Hatikva Neighborhood Stadium; Attendance: 1000; Referee: Zvi Sharir

== Final stage ==
=== 3rd-4th Place Match ===
15 September 1982

Bnei Yehuda	0–2	Hapoel Kfar Saba
	Report (in Hebrew)	Yani 15'; Maimoni 34'

Ramat Gan Stadium
Attendance: 2000
Referee: Ya'akov Scheiner

=== Final ===
15 September 1982

Maccabi Netanya	3–1	Hapoel Be'er Sheva
Lavi 38'; Etzioni 48'; Franco 64' (o.g.)	Report (in Hebrew)	Ovadia Zvi 49'

Ramat Gan Stadium
Attendance: 4000
Referee: Moshe Ashkenazi
