= Machnes =

Machnes is a surname. Notable people with the surname include:

- Arie Machnes (1921–2008), Israeli footballer
- Gad Machnes (footballer) (born 1956), Israeli footballer and manager
- Gad Machnes (politician) (1893–1954), Israeli politician
- Oded Machnes (born 1956), Israeli footballer and manager
