= Arie Alter =

Israeli footballer

Arie Alter אריה אלטר
Personal information
- Full name: Arie Alter
- Date of birth: June 4, 1961 (age 65)
- Place of birth: Herzliya, Israel

Senior career*
Years	Team	Apps	(Gls)
1977–1980	Maccabi Herzliya		
1980–1984	Maccabi Netanya		
1984–1985	Maccabi Jaffa		
1985–1990	Hapoel Tel Aviv		
1988–1989	Hapoel Tiberias (loan)		
1990–1992	Hapoel Be'er Sheva		
1992–1993	Maccabi Herzliya		
1993–1994	Hapoel Tel Aviv		
1994	Hapoel Ramat Gan		

International career
1983–1984	Israel	8	(0)
- * Club domestic league appearances and goals

Arie Alter (Hebrew: אריה אלטר) is a former Israeli footballer who later worked as the chairman of the IFPA (Israel Football Players' Association).

== Honours ==
- Championships
  - 1982–83, 1985-1986, 1987-1988
- League Cup
  - 1982–83, 1983–84
- Israeli Supercup
  - 1983
- UEFA Intertoto Cup
  - 1983
