= Gabi Rosendoren =

Israeli footballer

Gabi Rosendoren גבי רוזנדורן
Personal information
- Full name: Gabriel Rosendoren
- Date of birth: 30 October 1947
- Place of birth: Israel
- Date of death: 27 April 1980 (aged 32)
- Position: Midfielder

Senior career*
| Years | Team | Apps | (Gls) |
| 1965–1968 | Hapoel Herzliya | | |
| 1968–1976 | Hapoel Petah Tikva | 198 | (17) |
| 1976–1979 | Maccabi Netanya | | |
| 1979–1980 | Hapoel Yehud | | |

International career
| 1971–1975 | Israel | 7 | (0) |
- * Club domestic league appearances and goals

Gabi Rosendoren (Hebrew: גבי רוזנדורן; 30 October 1947 – 27 April 1980) was an Israeli footballer who played for the national team of Israel and also played in the local top division for 12 seasons with Hapoel Petah Tikva, Maccabi Netanya and Hapoel Yehud.

== Honours ==
- Championships
  - 1977–78
- State Cup
  - 1977–78
- Israeli Supercup
  - 1978
- UEFA Intertoto Cup
  - 1978
