= 1977–78 Israel State Cup =

Tournament details
- Country: Israel

Final positions
- Champions: Maccabi Netanya
- Runners-up: Bnei Yehuda

The 1977–78 Israel State Cup (Hebrew: גביע המדינה, Gvia HaMedina) was the 39th season of Israel's nationwide football cup competition and the 24th after the Israeli Declaration of Independence.

The competition was won by Maccabi Netanya, who have beaten Bnei Yehuda 2–1 at the final.

== Results ==
=== Fifth Round ===
Home team	Score	Away team
Hapoel Ramat HaSharon	4–2	Hapoel Givat Olga
Beitar Be'er Sheva	2–0	Maccabi Hatzor
Beitar Ramla	5–2 (a.e.t.)	Hapoel Be'er Ya'akov
Beitar Netanya	5–1	Beitar Nahariya
Maccabi Holon	1–2	Hapoel Ra'anana
Hapoel Nahliel	0–1 (a.e.t.)	Beitar Ashdod
Hapoel Kiryat Ono	1–1 (a.e.t.) 2–3 p.	Hapoel Beit She'an
Hapoel Afikim	1–4	Hapoel Marmorek
Maccabi Ramla	0–1	Hapoel Nazareth Illit
Maccabi Be'er Sheva	2–0	Hapoel Tel Hanan
Hapoel Ashkelon	1–0	Hapoel Tayibe
Hapoel Tiberias	1–0	Hapoel Ramla
SK Nes Tziona	4–2	Maccabi Herzliya
Hapoel Beit Eliezer	1–0	Hapoel Migdal HaEmek
Maccabi Shikun HaMizrah	2–1	Hapoel Dimona
Hapoel Bat Yam	2–1	Maccabi Hadera

=== Sixth Round ===
Home team	Score	Away team
Maccabi Petah Tikva	2–0	Hapoel Ramat Gan
Hapoel Tirat HaCarmel	1–3	Hapoel Marmorek
Bnei Yehuda	2–0 (a.e.t.)	Hapoel Beit Eliezer
Maccabi Ramat Amidar	3–1 (a.e.t.)	Hapoel Ramat HaSharon
Hapoel Rishon LeZion	1–0	Hapoel Ashdod
Maccabi Be'er Sheva	0–0 (a.e.t.) 3–2 p.	Beitar Ashdod
Hapoel Holon	4–0	Hapoel Ashkelon
Beitar Netanya	5–0	Hapoel Beit She'an
Maccabi Shikun HaMizrah	3–1	Hapoel Ra'anana
Beitar Be'er Sheva	0–2	Maccabi Haifa
Hapoel Nazareth Illit	2–1	Hapoel Bat Yam
Hapoel Beit Shemesh	0–1	Hapoel Petah Tikva
Hapoel Netanya	1–0	Beitar Ramla
Hapoel Tiberias	1–1 (a.e.t.) 0–3 p.	Maccabi Sha'arayim

Byes: Hapoel Kfar Saba, SK Nes Tziona.

=== Seventh Round ===
Home team	Score	Away team
Maccabi Ramat Amidar	1–2 (a.e.t.)	Maccabi Tel Aviv
Hapoel Marmorek	1–0	Maccabi Jaffa
Hapoel Yehud	1–0; Abandoned	Maccabi Be'er Sheva
Maccabi Netanya	3–1 (a.e.t.)	SK Nes Tziona
Hapoel Tel Aviv	0–2	Bnei Yehuda
Hapoel Be'er Sheva	0–3	Maccabi Petah Tikva
Hakoah Maccabi Ramat Gan	4–2 (a.e.t.)	Hapoel Petah Tikva
Maccabi Shikun HaMizrah	2–2 (a.e.t.) 1–4 p.	Hapoel Haifa
Beitar Tel Aviv	3–0	Beitar Netanya
Hapoel Acre	1–0	Hapoel Netanya
Maccabi Sha'arayim	2–3	Hapoel Hadera
Hapoel Jerusalem	0–1	Maccabi Haifa
Beitar Jerusalem	4–0	Hapoel Holon
Hapoel Kfar Saba	3–2 (a.e.t.)	Shimshon Tel Aviv

Byes: Hapoel Nazareth Illit, Hapoel Rishon LeZion.

=== Round of 16 ===
Home team	Score	Away team
Beitar Jerusalem	8–1	Hapoel Rishon LeZion
Bnei Yehuda	2–0	Hapoel Hadera
Hapoel Kfar Saba	2–1	Hapoel Nazareth Illit
Maccabi Haifa	2–0	Hapoel Haifa
Beitar Tel Aviv	0–3	Maccabi Netanya
Maccabi Tel Aviv	2–2 (a.e.t.) 4–5 p.	Maccabi Petah Tikva
Hapoel Marmorek	0–1	Hapoel Yehud
Hapoel Acre	2–2 (a.e.t.) 3–1 p.	Hakoah Maccabi Ramat Gan

=== Quarter-finals ===
Home team	Score	Away team
Hapoel Yehud	2–2 (a.e.t.) 4–2 p.	Maccabi Haifa
Beitar Jerusalem	1–1 (a.e.t.) 4–3 p.	Maccabi Petah Tikva
Bnei Yehuda	1–0	Hapoel Acre
Maccabi Netanya	5–2	Hapoel Kfar Saba

=== Semi-finals ===
Home team	Score	Away team
Maccabi Netanya	1–0	Hapoel Yehud
Bnei Yehuda	2–1	Beitar Jerusalem

=== Final ===
24 May 1978

Maccabi Netanya	2–1	Bnei Yehuda
Machnes 3'; Gariani 16'		Ben Tuvim 89' (pen.)

Ramat Gan Stadium
Attendance: 45000
Referee: Hogeg
