= Gideon Kleinman =

Israeli footballer (1955–2025)

Gideon Kleinman גדעון קליינמן
Personal information
- Date of birth: 1955
- Place of birth: Israel
- Date of death: 14 August 2025 (aged 70)

Youth career
- Maccabi Netanya

Senior career*
Years	Team	Apps	(Gls)
1972–1982	Maccabi Netanya	165	(9)
- Maccabi Hadera
- * Club domestic league appearances and goals

Gideon Kleinman (Hebrew: גדעון קליינמן; 1955 – 14 August 2025) was an Israeli footballer who was mostly known for playing in Maccabi Netanya in the 1970s and early 1980s. Kleinman died on 14 August 2025, at the age of 70.

== Honours ==
- Championships: 1973–74, 1977–78, 1979–80
- State Cup: 1978
- Israeli Supercup: 1974, 1978, 1980
- UEFA Intertoto Cup: 1978, 1980
