= Moshe Gariani =

Israeli footballer (1957–2025)

Moshe Gariani משה גריאני
Personal information
- Date of birth: 18 June 1957
- Place of birth: Tiberias, Israel
- Date of death: 11 March 2025 (aged 67)
- Position: Defender

Youth career
- Maccabi Netanya

Senior career*
Years	Team	Apps	(Gls)
1977–1985	Maccabi Netanya	206	(43)
1980–1981	→ Brighton & Hove Albion (loan)	1	(0)
1985–1988	Maccabi Tel Aviv	86	(11)
1988–1989	Maccabi Yavne		

International career
1978–1981	Israel	11	(0)

Managerial career
- Beitar Nes Tubruk (youth)
- 2008–2010: Maccabi Netanya (youth)
- 2012–2013: Maccabi Netanya (youth)
- * Club domestic league appearances and goals

Moshe Gariani (Hebrew: משה גריאני; 18 June 1957 – 11 March 2025) was an Israeli international footballer.

== Playing career ==
As a member of the Israel national football team, Gariani impressed manager Alan Mullery in a friendly match against Brighton & Hove Albion. He was subsequently signed but made just one appearance for the club in a match against Southampton in 1980.

== Death ==
Gariani died on 11 March 2025, at the age of 67.

== Honours ==
- Championships: 1977–78, 1979–80, 1982–83
- Israel State Cup: 1978, 1987, 1988
- Toto Cup: 1982–83, 1983–84
- Israeli Supercup: 1978, 1983
- UEFA Intertoto Cup: 1978, 1983, 1984
