= Gad Machnes =

Gad Machnes (Hebrew: גד מכנס) may refer to:

- Gad Machnes (politician) (1893–1954), Israeli politician and businessman
- Gad Machnes (footballer) (born 1956), Israeli footballer
