= Haim Bar =

Israeli footballer

Personal information
- Full name: Haim Bar
- Date of birth: 14 May 1954 (age 72)
- Place of birth: Israel
- Position: Defender

Youth career
- Maccabi Netanya

Senior career*
Years	Team	Apps	(Gls)
1972–1989	Maccabi Netanya	417	(10)

International career
1974–1983	Israel	38	(1)
- * Club domestic league appearances and goals

Haim Bar (Hebrew: חיים בר; born 14 May 1954) is a former Israeli footballer who spent his entire career playing for Maccabi Netanya.

== Honours ==
- Israeli Premier League:
  - Winner (4): 1973–74, 1977–78, 1979–80, 1982–83
  - Runner-up (3): 1974-75, 1981–82, 1987–88
- Israel State Cup:
  - Winner (1): 1977-78
- Israeli Supercup:
  - Winner (4): 1973-74, 1977–78, 1979–80, 1982-83
- UEFA Intertoto Cup:
  - Winner (4): 1978, 1980, 1983, 1984
- Toto Cup:
  - Runner-up (2): 1986-87, 1988–89
