= Arie Machnes =

Israeli footballer

Arie Machnes אריה מכנס
Personal information
- Full name: Arie Machnes
- Date of birth: 1921
- Place of birth: Israel
- Date of death: 22 May 2008 (aged 86–87)
- Position: Midfielder

Youth career
- Maccabi Herzliya

Senior career*
Years	Team	Apps	(Gls)
1939–1941	Maccabi Herzliya		
1941–1956	Maccabi Netanya		

International career
1942–1943	Eretz Israel	3	(0)
- * Club domestic league appearances and goals

Arie Machnes (Hebrew: אריה מכנס; 1921-2008) was an Israeli footballer who played in Maccabi Herzliya and Maccabi Netanya.

Both of his sons, Oded and Gad played for Maccabi Netanya and of the Israel national football team.

== Honours ==
- Israel State Cup:
  - Runner-up (1): 1954
