= Israel Hajaj =

Israeli footballer

Israel Hajaj 'ישראל חג'ג
Personal information
- Full name: Israel Hajaj
- Date of birth: October 12, 1950 (age 76)
- Place of birth: Netanya, Israel

Youth career
- Maccabi Netanya

Senior career*
Years	Team	Apps	(Gls)
1970–1980	Maccabi Netanya		
1980–1981	Maccabi Petah Tikva		
1981–1983	Hapoel Kfar Saba		

International career
1974–1976	Israel	4	(0)
- * Club domestic league appearances and goals

Israel Hajaj (Hebrew: 'ישראל חג'ג) is a retired Israeli footballer who is known for being the legendary captain of Maccabi Netanya in the late 1970s. He is of a Tunisian-Jewish descent.

== Honours ==
=== National ===
- Israeli Premier League (5):
  - 1970–71, 1973–74, 1977–78, 1979–80, 1981–82
- State Cup (1):
  - 1978

=== International ===
- UEFA Intertoto Cup (2):
  - 1978, 1980
