= Albert Gazal =

Israeli footballer

Albert Gazal אלברט גזל
Personal information
- Full name: Albert Gazal
- Date of birth: 1950
- Place of birth: Egypt
- Position: Midfielder

Youth career
- Maccabi Netanya

Senior career*
| Years | Team | Apps | (Gls) |
| 1969–1982 | Maccabi Netanya | 347 | (?) |

Managerial career
- 1995–1996: Maccabi Netanya
- * Club domestic league appearances and goals

Albert Gazal (Hebrew: אלברט גזל) is a retired Israeli footballer who was a player in Maccabi Netanya. He is also the father of Ravid Gazal (who also played for Maccabi Netanya).

== Honours ==
=== National ===
- Israeli Premier League (4):
  - 1970–71, 1973–74, 1977-78, 1979–80
- State Cup (1):
  - 1978

=== International ===
- UEFA Intertoto Cup (2):
  - 1978, 1980
