= List of Israeli football champions =

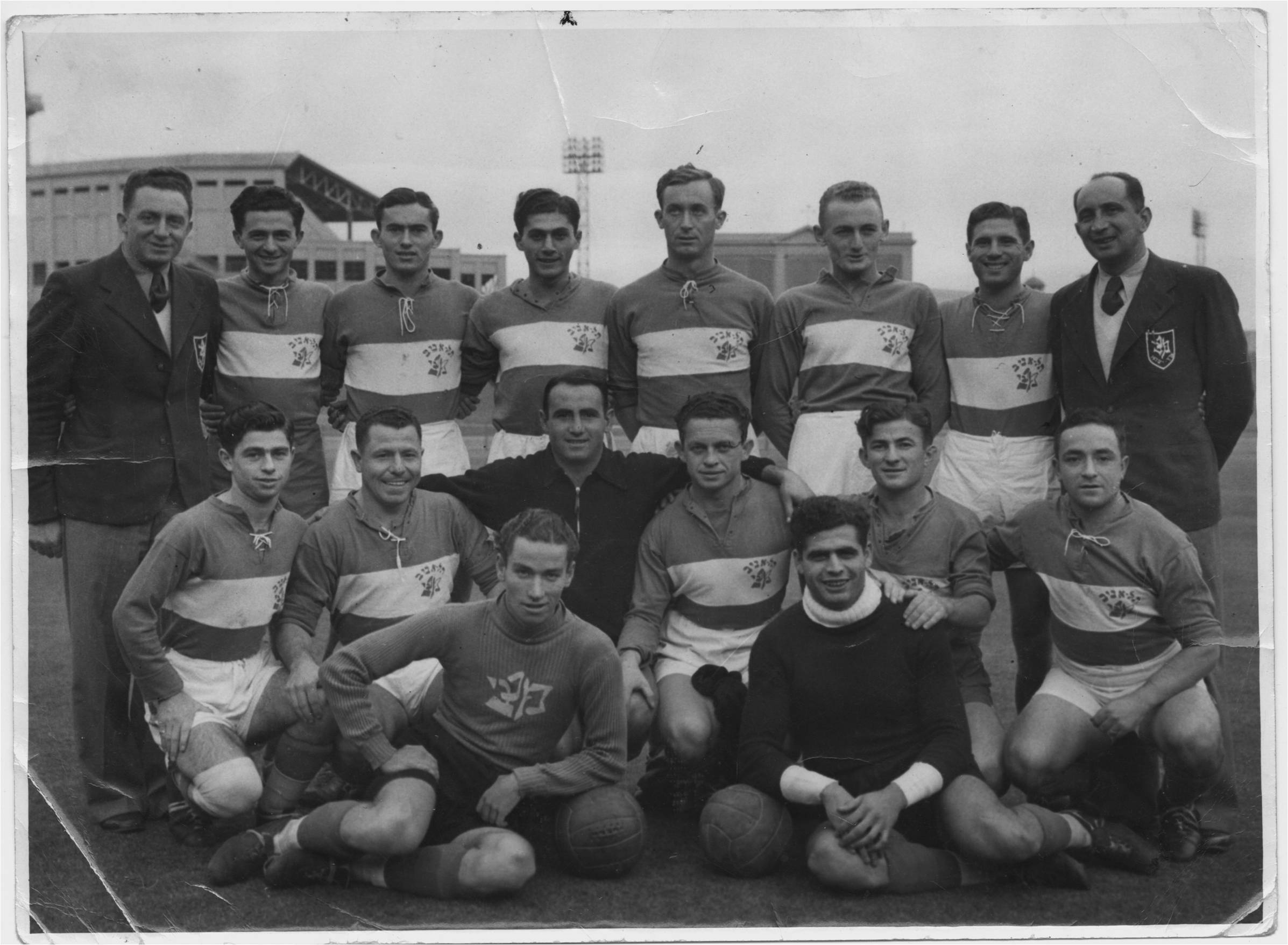
In terms of titles won, Maccabi Tel Aviv are Israel's most successful club. The Maccabi squad of 1939 is pictured at Sydney Cricket Ground during a tour of Australia.

The association football champions of Israel are the winners of the highest league in Israeli football, which is currently the Israeli Premier League. The league is contested on a round robin basis, and the championship is awarded to the team that is top of the league at the end of the season. Having won the 2025–26 competition, Hapoel Be’er Sheva are the current champions.

Following the creation of the Eretz Israel Football Association in August 1928, the first nationwide football championship in Mandatory Palestine, the Palestine League, began in October 1930, although this competition was abandoned. The Palestine League's last edition was played during the 1947–48 season, and was abandoned as well due to the Independence War. The league resumed in May 1949, and since then the national championship has been played under three names: Liga Alef, between 1949 and 1955; Liga Leumit, from 1955 to 1999; and finally, since 1999, the Israeli Premier League.

In all, Maccabi Tel Aviv holds the record for most championships, with 25 titles; they are also the only Israeli club to have never been relegated from the top division. The next most successful teams are Maccabi Haifa (15 titles) and Hapoel Tel Aviv (11), followed by Beitar Jerusalem and Hapoel Petah Tikva six titles each. While Maccabi and Hapoel Tel Aviv have always been major players in the league championship, the consistent success of Maccabi Haifa and Beitar Jerusalem has been a relatively recent phenomenon, both clubs having won their first title during the 1980s. The longest run of successive titles is five, won by Hapoel Petah Tikva between the 1958–59 and 1962–63 seasons.

== Champions ==
Key

^{†}	Champions also won the Israel State Cup during the same season. (People's Cup before 1948)
^{‡}	Champions also won the League Cup during the same season. (began play in 1984)
^{§}	Champions also won both cups during the same season.
(titles)	A running tally of the total number of championships won by each club is kept in brackets.

=== Palestine League (1931–1947) ===
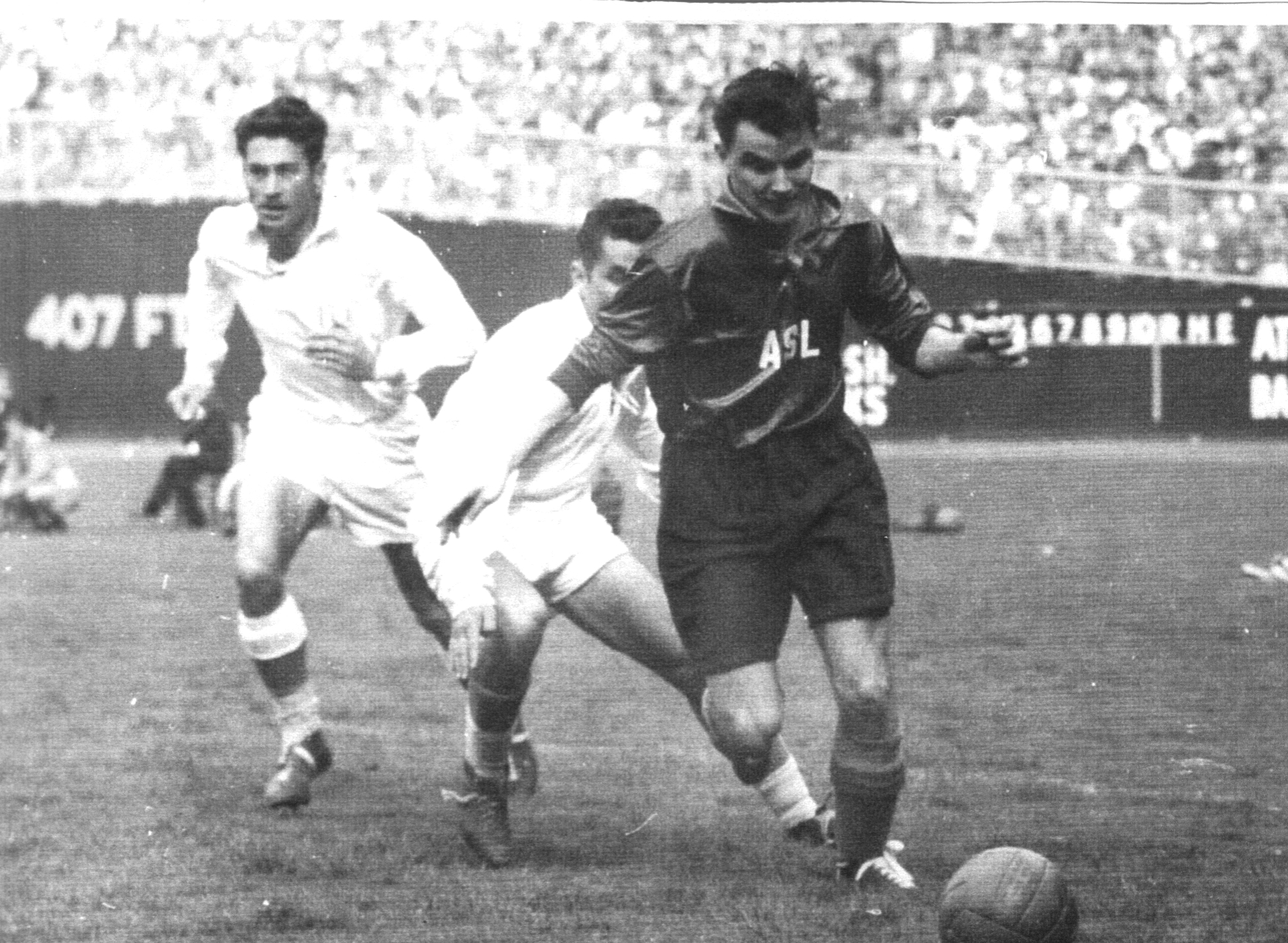
Hapoel Tel Aviv (light shirts) took on the American Soccer League's all-star team at Ebbets Field, New York in 1947.

The inaugural Palestine League title was won by British Police, who finished the season unbeaten and also won the People's Cup to complete the country's first double. Except for the Jerusalem-based British Police's initial victory, only clubs from Tel Aviv won the title during the Mandate period; Hapoel and Maccabi Tel Aviv won five and four championships, respectively. (Note: Because of the inconsistent league programme during the 1930s and 1940s, controversy remains concerning the number of titles won by Hapoel Tel Aviv during that period. The 1934–35 championship was abandoned with Hapoel Tel Aviv leading the standings. The IFA lists the title on its website. The 1937–38 league season was also abandoned long before its end because of the Arab revolt in Palestine, once more with Hapoel Tel Aviv top of the table. As with the unfinished 1934–35 title, the Israel Football Association today lists the club as having won the 1937–38 crown. Counting both of these titles, Hapoel have five Palestine League championships and 13 in total, but FIFA and UEFA only credit the club with four pre-1948 titles, giving an overall total of 12. The club itself claims to have won 13 titles, five before independence and eight afterwards. This figure is corroborated by the Israel Football Association and Ynet.) Because of violent conflicts involving the Yishuv, the competition's scheduling was inconsistent, and in some seasons no national championship was held, or league competitions were abandoned.

Full league standings and top scorer details are not known at this time.

Champions of the Palestine League (1931–1947)
Season	Winner (titles)	Runners-up	Notes
1930–31	Not Finished	–	(Note: The competition started on 3 October 1930 and was abandoned in November 1930 as the High Commissioner ordered the British clubs to stop playing Jewish clubs due to violent incidents in matches.)
1931–32	British Police (1)^{†}	Hapoel Tel Aviv	—
1932–33	Not Finished	–	(Note: The Hapoel teams withdrew from the PFA, and a league was held with Maccabi teams only. The competition was abandoned when Hapoel rejoined the PFA.)
1933–34	Hapoel Tel Aviv (1)^{†}	Maccabi Hashmonai	—
1934–35	Not Finished	–	
1935–36	Maccabi Tel Aviv (1)	Hakoah Tel Aviv	—
1937	Maccabi Tel Aviv (2)	Hapoel Tel Aviv	—
1938	Not Finished	–	
1939	Maccabi Tel Aviv (3)	Hapoel Tel Aviv	(Note: No national championship was held; instead, regional leagues took place in Tel Aviv (two divisions), Sharon, and Judah areas. Maccabi Tel Aviv won the Tel Aviv district league and was recognized as champions by the IFA. Beitar Netanya and Maccabi Rehovot won the other regional leagues.)
1940	Hapoel Tel Aviv (2)	Beitar Tel Aviv	—
1940–41	Not Held	–	(Note: Due to disagreements between Maccabi and Hapoel, the league wasn't played. Each sport association held its own league, with Maccabi Petah Tikva winning the Maccabi League and Hapoel Tel Aviv and Hapoel Raanana winning the Southern and Samaria divisions of the Hapoel League, respectively.)
1941–42	Maccabi Tel Aviv (4)	Maccabi Rishon LeZion	(Note: The league was played in three regional divisions, in Haifa, Tel Aviv and Jerusalem, although the Haifa division was cancelled after a few weeks. The two other divisions required over a year to finish, and a championship playoff was played with Homenetmen (Jerusalem winners), Maccabi Rishon LeZion (Tel Aviv winners) and Maccabi Tel Aviv (Tel Aviv runners-up) participating. Maccabi Tel Aviv won the playoff and the title.)
1942–43	Not Held	–	(Note: As the previous season was still being played during the 1942-43 football season, no new league was played.)
1943–44	Hapoel Tel Aviv (3)	Maccabi Rehovot	(Note: Although the league was designated as a Wartime football league and not as a national league, the IFA recognizes the title for Hapoel Tel Aviv.)
1944–45	Hapoel Tel Aviv (4); Beitar Tel Aviv (1)	Hapoel Ramat Gan; Maccabi Rehovot	(Note: Two regional leagues were held instead of a national championship. Beitar Tel Aviv finished top of the Southern District league while Hapoel Tel Aviv won in the Northern District. The IFA recognized both teams as league champions for this season.)
1945–46	Not Finished	–	(Note: The Maccabi teams withdrew from the PFA, and a league was held with Hapoel teams only. The competition was abandoned when Maccabi rejoined the PFA.)
1946–47	Maccabi Tel Aviv (5)^{†}	Beitar Tel Aviv	—
1947–48	Not Finished	–	(Note: The league was abandoned due to the outbreak of the 1947–1949 Palestine war. The IFA listed the league leaders at the time of abandonment, Nordia Tel Aviv as champions for this season.)
1948	Not Finished	–	(Note: The league was formed as a substitute for the Palestine League, which was abandoned due to the 1947–1949 Palestine war. The league was abandoned after only a handful of matches were played. The IFA listed the league leaders at the time of abandonment, Nordia Tel Aviv as champions for this season.)

=== Israeli League (1949–1951) ===
Following Israel's creation in 1948, the association dropped "Eretz" from its name and the cup was renamed the Israel Cup. The league championship was held as the "Israeli League" for one season, in 1949–50; Maccabi Tel Aviv won the title.

Champions of the Israeli League (1949–1951)
Season	Winner (titles)	Runners-up	Third place	Top scorer	Goals	Notes
1949–50	Maccabi Tel Aviv (6)	Hapoel Tel Aviv	Hapoel Haifa	Yosef Merimovich (Maccabi Tel Aviv)	25	—
1950–51	Not Held	—	—	—	—	—

=== Liga Alef (1951–1955) ===
A new top division, Liga Alef started play with the 1951–52 season. It became the second tier of Israeli football in 1955–56, when it was superseded as the top flight by Liga Leumit. Maccabi Tel Aviv won the first two of the championships held under this name, whilst the 1954–55 season ended with the championship leaving Tel Aviv for the first time since the first league season, 1931–32; Hapoel Petah Tikva finished the season top of the league while Maccabi and Hapoel Tel Aviv came in second and third place respectively

Champions of the Liga Alef (1951–1955)
Season	Winner (titles)	Runners-up	Third place	Top scorer	Goals	Notes
1951–52	Maccabi Tel Aviv (7)	Maccabi Petah Tikva	Hapoel Haifa	Yehoshua Glazer (Maccabi Tel Aviv)	24	—
1952–53	Not Held	—	—	—	—	—
1953–54	Maccabi Tel Aviv (8)^{†}	Maccabi Petah Tikva	Hapoel Petah Tikva	Eliezer Spiegel (Maccabi Petah Tikva)	16	—
1954–55	Hapoel Petah Tikva (1)	Maccabi Tel Aviv	Hapoel Tel Aviv	Nisim Elmaliah (Beitar Tel Aviv)	30	—

=== Liga Leumit (1955–1999) ===
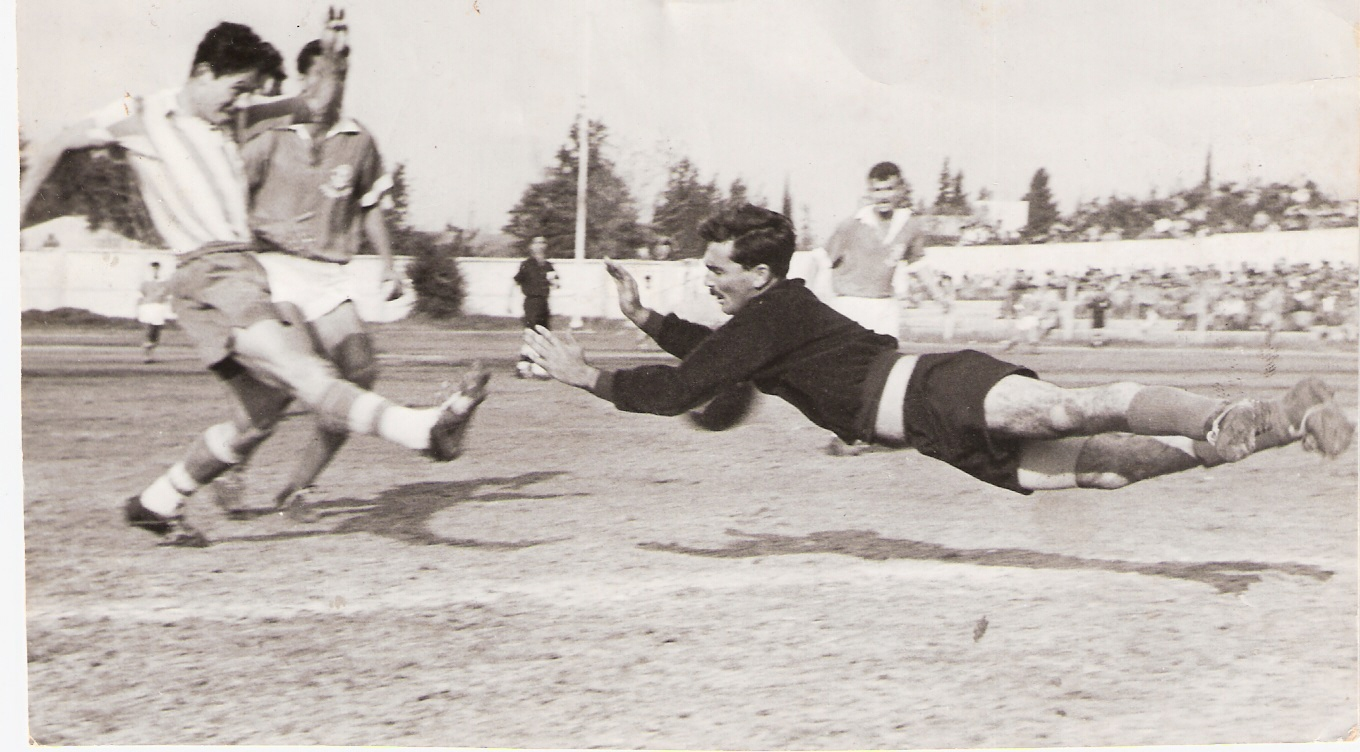
Nahum Stelmach (left, striped shirt) takes a shot for Hapoel Petah Tikva during the 1950s. Stelmach was a key player as the club won five titles in a row between 1958 and 1963.

The inaugural Liga Leumit season, 1955–56, ended with the championship won by Maccabi Tel Aviv, which won two of the next three titles and Hapoel Tel Aviv one. Hapoel Petah Tikva then finished in second place three times in a row, before starting a record run of five successive championship victories. Hapoel Petah Tikva's run of five consecutive titles between the 1958–59 and 1962–63 seasons remains unmatched today. Two Ramat Gan clubs, Hapoel Ramat Gan and Hakoah Ramat Gan, then claimed a title each before Hapoel Tel Aviv took the title to Tel Aviv at the end of the 1965–66 season. In the 1966–68 season, often referred to as the "double season", the sixteen teams played each other twice at home and twice away during a season lasting two years.

During the 1970s and 1980s, six teams won their first championships; Maccabi Netanya took four titles between 1970 and 1980 while Hapoel Be'er Sheva won two back-to-back in 1974–75 and 1975–76. Hapoel Kfar Saba, Maccabi Haifa, Beitar Jerusalem and Bnei Yehuda Tel Aviv all won their first titles during the 1980s. After Bnei Yehuda's victory in 1989–90, Maccabi Haifa, Maccabi Tel Aviv and Beitar Jerusalem dominated the remainder of the top-flight Liga Leumit era, winning every title except the last; the 1998–99 championship was won by first-time victors Hapoel Haifa.

Israeli football champions of the Liga Leumit era
Season	Winner (titles)	Runners-up	Third place	Top scorer	Goals	Notes
1955–56	Maccabi Tel Aviv (9)	Hapoel Petah Tikva	Hapoel Tel Aviv	Avraham Levi (Beitar Tel Aviv); Michael Michaelov (Beitar Tel Aviv)	16	—
1956–57	Hapoel Tel Aviv (5)	Hapoel Petah Tikva	Maccabi Tel Aviv	Avraham Ginzburg (Hapoel Haifa)	16	—
1957–58	Maccabi Tel Aviv (10)^{†}	Hapoel Petah Tikva	Maccabi Haifa	Rafi Levi (Maccabi Tel Aviv)	14	—
1958–59	Hapoel Petah Tikva (2)	Hapoel Haifa	Maccabi Tel Aviv	Aharon Amar (Maccabi Haifa)	17	—
1959–60	Hapoel Petah Tikva (3)	Maccabi Tel Aviv	Hapoel Haifa	Rafi Levi (Maccabi Tel Aviv)	19	—
1960–61	Hapoel Petah Tikva (4)	Hapoel Tel Aviv	Hapoel Haifa	Shlomo Levi (Hapoel Haifa); Zharia Ratzabi (Hapoel Petah Tikva)	15	—
1961–62	Hapoel Petah Tikva (5)	Maccabi Jaffa	Hapoel Tiberias	Shlomo Levi (Maccabi Haifa); Itzhak Nizri (Hapoel Tiberias)	16	—
1962–63	Hapoel Petah Tikva (6)	Hapoel Tel Aviv	Maccabi Jaffa	Zharia Ratzabi (Hapoel Petah Tikva)	12	—
1963–64	Hapoel Ramat Gan (1)	Maccabi Jaffa	Hapoel Petah Tikva	Israel Ashkenazi (Maccabi Jaffa)	21	—
1964–65	Hakoah Ramat Gan (1)	Hapoel Petah Tikva	Hapoel Tel Aviv	Israel Ashkenazi (Maccabi Jaffa); Itzhak Mizrahi (Bnei Yehuda Tel Aviv)	18	—
1965–66	Hapoel Tel Aviv (6)	Maccabi Tel Aviv	Hapoel Petah Tikva	Moshe Romano (Shimshon Tel Aviv); Mordechai Spiegler (Maccabi Netanya)	17	—
1966–68	Maccabi Tel Aviv (11)	Hapoel Petah Tikva	Hapoel Haifa	Mordechai Spiegler (Maccabi Netanya)	38	(Note: During the 1966–68 "double season", Mordechai Spiegler scored 38 goals; counting the two halves of the season separately, he scored 15 during 1966–67 and 23 during 1967–68.)
1968–69	Hapoel Tel Aviv (7)	Maccabi Tel Aviv	Maccabi Netanya	Mordechai Spiegler (Maccabi Netanya)	25	—
1969–70	Maccabi Tel Aviv (12)^{†}	Hapoel Tel Aviv	Maccabi Haifa	Moshe Romano (Shimshon Tel Aviv)	15	—
1970–71	Maccabi Netanya (1)	Shimshon Tel Aviv	Hapoel Tel Aviv	Eli Ben Rimoz (Hapoel Jerusalem)	20	—
1971–72	Maccabi Tel Aviv (13)	Beitar Jerusalem	Hakoah Ramat Gan	Yehouda Shaharabani (Hakoah Ramat Gan)	21	—
1972–73	Hakoah Ramat Gan (2)	Hapoel Tel Aviv	Hapoel Jerusalem	Moshe Romano (Beitar Tel Aviv)	18	—
1973–74	Maccabi Netanya (2)	Maccabi Tel Aviv	Beitar Jerusalem	Benny Alon (Hapoel Haifa)	15	—
1974–75	Hapoel Be'er Sheva (1)	Maccabi Netanya	Hapoel Haifa	Moshe Romano (Shimshon Tel Aviv)	17	—
1975–76	Hapoel Be'er Sheva (2)	Beitar Jerusalem	Hapoel Haifa	Oded Machnes (Maccabi Netanya)	21	—
1976–77	Maccabi Tel Aviv (14)^{†}	Maccabi Jaffa	Beitar Jerusalem	Vicky Peretz (Maccabi Tel Aviv)	17	—
1977–78	Maccabi Netanya (3)^{†}	Beitar Jerusalem	Maccabi Tel Aviv	David Lavi (Maccabi Netanya)	16	—
1978–79	Maccabi Tel Aviv (15)	Beitar Jerusalem	Maccabi Netanya	Oded Machnes (Maccabi Netanya); Eli Miali (Beitar Jerusalem)	18	—
1979–80	Maccabi Netanya (4)	Hapoel Tel Aviv	Shimshon Tel Aviv	David Lavi (Maccabi Netanya)	18	—
1980–81	Hapoel Tel Aviv (8)	Bnei Yehuda Tel Aviv	Maccabi Jaffa	Hertzel Fitusi (Maccabi Petah Tikva)	22	—
1981–82	Hapoel Kfar Saba (1)	Maccabi Netanya	Bnei Yehuda Tel Aviv	Oded Machnes (Maccabi Netanya)	26	—
1982–83	Maccabi Netanya (5)	Shimshon Tel Aviv	Hapoel Be'er Sheva	Oded Machnes (Maccabi Netanya)	22	—
1983–84	Maccabi Haifa (1)	Beitar Jerusalem	Hapoel Tel Aviv	David Lavi (Maccabi Netanya)	16	—
1984–85	Maccabi Haifa (2)	Beitar Jerusalem	Shimshon Tel Aviv	David Lavi (Maccabi Netanya)	18	—
1985–86	Hapoel Tel Aviv (9)	Maccabi Haifa	Maccabi Tel Aviv	Uri Malmilian (Beitar Jerusalem); Doron Rabinzon (Maccabi Petah Tikva)	14	—
1986–87	Beitar Jerusalem (1)	Bnei Yehuda Tel Aviv	Maccabi Tel Aviv	Eli Yani (Hapoel Kfar Saba)	16	—
1987–88	Hapoel Tel Aviv (10)	Maccabi Netanya	Hapoel Be'er Sheva	Zahi Armeli (Maccabi Haifa)	25	—
1988–89	Maccabi Haifa (3)	Hapoel Petah Tikva	Maccabi Netanya	Benny Tabak (Maccabi Tel Aviv)	18	—
1989–90	Bnei Yehuda Tel Aviv (1)	Hapoel Petah Tikva	Maccabi Haifa	Uri Malmilian (Maccabi Tel Aviv)	16	—
1990–91	Maccabi Haifa (4)^{†}	Hapoel Petah Tikva	Beitar Tel Aviv	Nir Levine (Hapoel Petah Tikva)	20	—
1991–92	Maccabi Tel Aviv (16)	Bnei Yehuda Tel Aviv	Maccabi Haifa	Alon Mizrahi (Bnei Yehuda Tel Aviv)	20	—
1992–93	Beitar Jerusalem (2)	Maccabi Tel Aviv	Bnei Yehuda Tel Aviv	Alon Mizrahi (Bnei Yehuda Tel Aviv)	26	—
1993–94	Maccabi Haifa (5)^{‡}	Maccabi Tel Aviv	Hapoel Be'er Sheva	Alon Mizrahi (Maccabi Haifa)	28	—
1994–95	Maccabi Tel Aviv (17)	Maccabi Haifa	Hapoel Be'er Sheva	Haim Revivo (Maccabi Haifa); Amir Turgeman (Maccabi Ironi Ashdod)	17	—
1995–96	Maccabi Tel Aviv (18)^{†}	Maccabi Haifa	Beitar Jerusalem	Haim Revivo (Maccabi Haifa)	26	—
1996–97	Beitar Jerusalem (3)	Hapoel Petah Tikva	Hapoel Be'er Sheva	Motti Kakoun (Hapoel Petah Tikva)	21	—
1997–98	Beitar Jerusalem (4)^{‡}	Hapoel Tel Aviv	Hapoel Haifa	Alon Mizrahi (Maccabi Haifa)	18	—
1998–99	Hapoel Haifa (1)	Maccabi Tel Aviv	Maccabi Haifa	Andrzej Kubica (Maccabi Tel Aviv)	21	—

=== Israeli Premier League (1999–present) ===
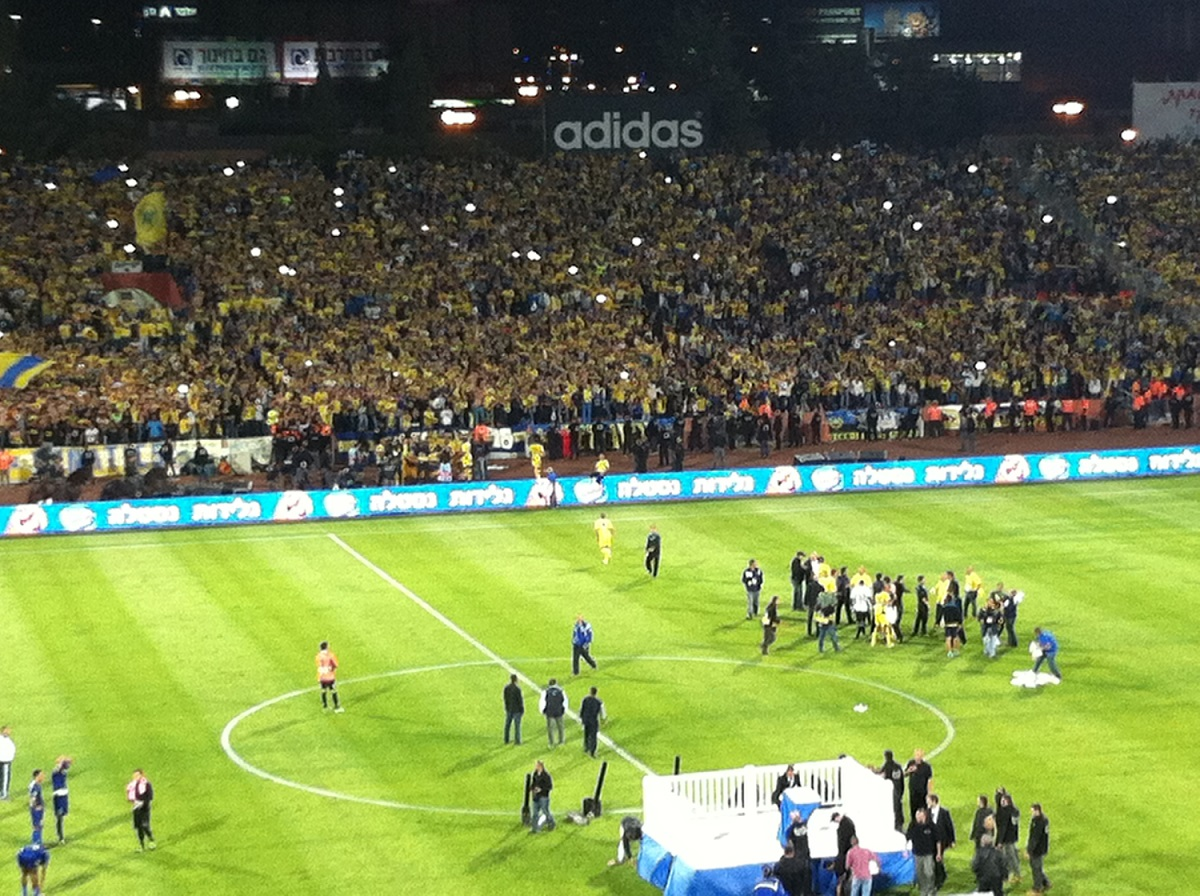
Maccabi Tel Aviv celebrate winning the title at the end of the 2012–13 season

When the Israeli Premier League became the top division of Israeli football in 1999–2000, Liga Leumit became the second division. Since then, only six clubs have won the title: Hapoel Tel Aviv, Ironi Kiryat Shmona, Hapoel Be'er Sheva, Maccabi Haifa, Maccabi Tel Aviv and Beitar Jerusalem. Hapoel Tel Aviv, Maccabi Haifa, Maccabi Tel Aviv and Beitar Jerusalem are sometimes referred to as the "Big Four" of Israeli football.

Having won seven titles in the league's 20 seasons, the most successful club during this period is Maccabi Haifa; during the same period, Maccabi Tel Aviv have added six to their total, Hapoel Be'er Sheva added three championships, while Beitar Jerusalem and Hapoel Tel Aviv have won two championships each. Although Hapoel Tel Aviv have only finished top of the league twice since 1999—in 1999–2000 and ten years later in 2009–10—they have won the double on both occasions.

This achievement was matched by Beitar Jerusalem in 2007–08. Ironi Kiryat Shmona won their first championship during the 2011–12 season, thereby becoming the first northern title-winners. Both Maccabi Tel Aviv and Hapoel Be'er Sheva have won three titles in a row.

Season	Winners (titles)	Runners-up	Third place	Top scorer	Goals	Notes
1999–2000	Hapoel Tel Aviv (11)^{† (Note: Won the Israel State Cup during the same season.)}	Maccabi Haifa	Hapoel Petah Tikva	Assi Tubi (Maccabi Petah Tikva)	27	–
2000–01	Maccabi Haifa (6)	Hapoel Tel Aviv	Hapoel Haifa^{‡ (Note: Won the League Cup during the same season.)}	Avi Nimni (Maccabi Tel Aviv)	25	
2001–02	Maccabi Haifa (7)	Hapoel Tel Aviv^{‡}	Maccabi Tel Aviv^{†}	Kobi Refua (Maccabi Petah Tikva)	18	–
2002–03	Maccabi Tel Aviv (19)	Maccabi Haifa^{‡}	Hapoel Tel Aviv	Yaniv Abargil (Hapoel Kfar Saba) • Shay Holtzman (Ironi Rishon LeZion / F.C. Ashdod)	18	–
2003–04	Maccabi Haifa (8)	Maccabi Tel Aviv	Maccabi Petah Tikva^{‡}	Ofir Haim (Hapoel Be'er Sheva) • Shay Holtzman (F.C. Ashdod)	16	–
2004–05	Maccabi Haifa (9)	Maccabi Petah Tikva	F.C. Ashdod	Roberto Colautti (Maccabi Haifa)	19	–
2005–06	Maccabi Haifa (10)^{‡}	Hapoel Tel Aviv	Beitar Jerusalem	Shay Holtzman (F.C. Ashdod)	18	–
2006–07	Beitar Jerusalem (5)	Maccabi Netanya	Maccabi Tel Aviv	Yaniv Azran (F.C. Ashdod)	15	–
2007–08	Beitar Jerusalem (6)^{†}	Maccabi Netanya	Ironi Kiryat Shmona	Samuel Yeboah (Hapoel Kfar Saba)	15	–
2008–09	Maccabi Haifa (11)	Hapoel Tel Aviv	Beitar Jerusalem^{†}	Barak Yitzhaki (Beitar Jerusalem) • Shimon Abuhatzira (Hapoel Petah Tikva) • Eliran Atar (Bnei Yehuda)	14	–
2009–10	Hapoel Tel Aviv (13)^{†}	Maccabi Haifa	Maccabi Tel Aviv	Shlomi Arbeitman (Maccabi Haifa)	28	–
2010–11	Maccabi Haifa (12)	Hapoel Tel Aviv ^{†}	Maccabi Tel Aviv	Toto Tamuz (Hapoel Tel Aviv)	21	–
2011–12	Ironi Kiryat Shmona (1)^{‡}	Hapoel Tel Aviv	Bnei Yehuda	Achmad Saba'a (Maccabi Netanya)	20	–
2012–13	Maccabi Tel Aviv (20)	Maccabi Haifa	Hapoel Tel Aviv	Eliran Atar (Maccabi Tel Aviv)	22	–
2013–14	Maccabi Tel Aviv (21)	Hapoel Be'er Sheva	Ironi Kiryat Shmona^{†}	Eran Zahavi (Maccabi Tel Aviv)	29	–
2014–15	Maccabi Tel Aviv (22)^{§ (Note: Won both cups during the same season.)}	Ironi Kiryat Shmona	Hapoel Be'er Sheva	Eran Zahavi (Maccabi Tel Aviv)	27	–
2015–16	Hapoel Be'er Sheva (3)	Maccabi Tel Aviv	Beitar Jerusalem	Eran Zahavi (Maccabi Tel Aviv)	35	–
2016–17	Hapoel Be'er Sheva (4) ^{‡}	Maccabi Tel Aviv	Beitar Jerusalem	Viðar Örn Kjartansson (Maccabi Tel Aviv)	19	–
2017–18	Hapoel Be'er Sheva (5)	Maccabi Tel Aviv^{‡}	Beitar Jerusalem	Dia Saba (Maccabi Netanya)	24	–
2018–19	Maccabi Tel Aviv (23)^{‡}	Maccabi Haifa	Hapoel Be'er Sheva	Ben Sahar (Hapoel Be'er Sheva)	15	–
2019–20	Maccabi Tel Aviv (24)	Maccabi Haifa	Beitar Jerusalem^{‡}	Nikita Rukavytsya (Maccabi Haifa)	22	–
2020–21	Maccabi Haifa (13)	Maccabi Tel Aviv^{§}	Ashdod	Nikita Rukavytsya (Maccabi Haifa)	19	–
2021–22	Maccabi Haifa (14)^{‡}	Hapoel Be'er Sheva^{†}	Maccabi Tel Aviv	Omer Atzili (Maccabi Haifa)	20	–
2022–23	Maccabi Haifa (15)	Hapoel Be'er Sheva	Maccabi Tel Aviv	Omer Atzili (Maccabi Haifa)	21	–
2023–24	Maccabi Tel Aviv (25)^{‡}	Maccabi Haifa	Hapoel Be'er Sheva	Dean David (Maccabi Haifa) • Eran Zahavi (Maccabi Tel Aviv)	20	–
2024–25	Maccabi Tel Aviv (26)^{‡}	Hapoel Be'er Sheva^{†}	Maccabi Haifa	Guy Melamed (Hapoel Haifa, Maccabi Haifa)	21	–
2025–26	Hapoel Be'er Sheva (6)	Beitar Jerusalem^{‡}	Maccabi Tel Aviv^{†}	Dor Peretz (Maccabi Tel Aviv)	19	–

== Performances ==
=== Performance by club ===
A star above the crest is awarded for every five titles.

Performance by club
Club	Titles	Runners-up	Winning seasons
Maccabi Tel Aviv ⭐⭐⭐⭐⭐	26	12	1935–36, 1937, 1939, 1941–42, 1946–47, 1949–50, 1951–52, 1953–54, 1955–56, 1957–58, 1966–68, 1969–70, 1971–72, 1976–77, 1978–79, 1991–92, 1994–95, 1995–96, 2002–03, 2012–13, 2013–14, 2014–15, 2018–19, 2019–20, 2023–24, 2024–25
Maccabi Haifa ⭐⭐⭐	15	10	1983–84, 1984–85, 1988–89, 1990–91, 1993–94, 2000–01, 2001–02, 2003–04, 2004–05, 2005–06, 2008–09, 2010–11, 2020–21, 2021–22, 2022–23
Hapoel Tel Aviv ⭐⭐	13	16	1933–34, 1940, 1943–44, 1956–57, 1965–66, 1968–69, 1980–81, 1985–86, 1987–88, 1999–2000, 2009–10
Hapoel Be'er Sheva ⭐	6	4	1974–75, 1975–76, 2015–16, 2016–17, 2017–18, 2025-26
Hapoel Petah Tikva ⭐	6	10	1954–55, 1958–59, 1959–60, 1960–61, 1961–62, 1962–63
Beitar Jerusalem ⭐	6	7	1986–87, 1992–93, 1996–97, 1997–98, 2006–07, 2007–08
Maccabi Netanya ⭐	5	5	1970–71, 1973–74, 1977–78, 1979–80, 1982–83
Hakoah Ramat Gan	2	—	1964–65, 1972–73
Bnei Yehuda Tel Aviv	1	3	1989–90
Beitar Tel Aviv	1	2	1944–45 (Note: Two regional leagues were held instead of a national championship. Beitar Tel Aviv finished top of the Southern District league while Hapoel Tel Aviv won in the Northern District. The IFA recognized both teams as league champions for this season.)
Hapoel Ramat Gan	1	1 (Note: In 1944–45, two regional leagues were held instead of a national championship. Beitar Tel Aviv and Hapoel Tel Avivwon the two divisions, with Maccabi Rehovot and Hapoel Ramat Gan finishing as runners-up.)	1963–64
Hapoel Haifa	1	1	1998–99
Ironi Kiryat Shmona	1	1	2011–12
British Police (Note: British Police ceased to exist along its parent organisation, the Palestine Police Force, in 1948.)	1	—	1931–32
Hapoel Kfar Saba	1	—	1981–82
Maccabi Petah Tikva	—	3	–
Maccabi Jaffa	—	3	–
Maccabi Rehovot	—	2 (Note: In 1944–45, two regional leagues were held instead of a national championship. Beitar Tel Aviv and Hapoel Tel Avivwon the two divisions, with Maccabi Rehovot and Hapoel Ramat Gan finishing as runners-up.)	–
Shimshon Tel Aviv	—	2	–
Maccabi Jerusalem	—	1	–
Hakoah Tel Aviv	—	1	–
Maccabi Rishon LeZion	—	1	–

=== Doubles by club ===
Titles won by club (%)
1. Maccabi Tel Aviv – 26 (28.0%)
2. Maccabi Haifa – 15 (18.0%)
3. Hapoel Tel Aviv – 13 (15.0%)
4. Beitar Jerusalem – 6 (8.00%)
5. Hapoel Petah Tikva – 6 (8.00%)
6. Hapoel Beer-Sheva – 6 (6.00%)
7. Maccabi Netanya – 5 (6.00%)
8. Other clubs – 9 (12.0%)

Six teams have completed the double by winning the Israeli State Cup during the same season. There have been 15 doubles won in total (including one treble, Maccabi Tel Aviv winning the championship, the State Cup and the Toto Cup in 2014–15); the most successful club in this regard is Maccabi Tel Aviv, who have been both league champions and cup winners on seven occasions.

Clubs to win the double
Club	Doubles	Double-winning seasons
Maccabi Tel Aviv	7	1946–47, 1953–54, 1957–58, 1969–70, 1976–77, 1995–96, 2014–15
Hapoel Tel Aviv	4	1933–34, 1937–38, 1999–2000, 2009–10
British Police	1	1931–32
Maccabi Netanya	1	1977–78
Maccabi Haifa	1	1990–91
Beitar Jerusalem	1	2007–08

=== Performance by city ===
The 15 title-winning clubs have come from a total of nine cities. The most successful city is Tel Aviv.

Titles won by city (%)
1. Tel Aviv – 39 (48.0%)
2. Haifa – 16 (17.0%)
3. Jerusalem – 7 (9.00%)
4. Petah Tikva – 6 (8.00%)
5. Netanya – 5 (6.00%)
6. Beersheba – 6 (6.00%)
7. Ramat Gan – 3 (4.00%)
8. Kfar Saba – 1 (1.00%)
9. Kiryat Shmona – 1 (1.00%)

Performance by city
City	Titles	Title-winning clubs
Tel Aviv	39	Maccabi Tel Aviv (25), Hapoel Tel Aviv (13), Bnei Yehuda Tel Aviv (1)
Haifa	16	Maccabi Haifa (15), Hapoel Haifa (1)
Jerusalem	7	Beitar Jerusalem (6), British Police (1)
Beersheba	6	Hapoel Be'er Sheva (6)
Petah Tikva	6	Hapoel Petah Tikva (6)
Netanya	5	Maccabi Netanya (5)
Ramat Gan	3	Hakoah Ramat Gan (2), Hapoel Ramat Gan (1)
Kfar Saba	1	Hapoel Kfar Saba (1)
Kiryat Shmona	1	Kiryat Shmona (1)

=== Performance by district ===
The Israeli championship has been won by 15 clubs from six districts. The most successful district is Tel Aviv District.

Performance by district
District	Titles	Title-winning clubs
Tel Aviv	42	Maccabi Tel Aviv (25), Hapoel Tel Aviv (13), Hakoah Ramat Gan (2), Bnei Yehuda Tel Aviv (1), Hapoel Ramat Gan (1)
Haifa	16	Maccabi Haifa (15), Hapoel Haifa (1)
Center	12	Hapoel Petah Tikva (6), Maccabi Netanya (5), Hapoel Kfar Saba (1)
Jerusalem	7	Beitar Jerusalem (6), British Police (1)
South	6	Hapoel Be'er Sheva (6)
North	1	Kiryat Shmona (1)
