= Danny Etzioni =

Israeli footballer

Danny Etzioni דני עציוני
Personal information
- Full name: Danny Etzioni
- Date of birth: 1 April 1959 (age 67)
- Place of birth: Herzliya, Israel
- Position: Midfielder

Youth career
- Hapoel Herzliya

Senior career*
Years	Team	Apps	(Gls)
1977–1981	Maccabi Herzliya		
1981–1990	Maccabi Netanya	157	(3)
1990	Maccabi Yavne		
1990–1993	Maccabi Herzliya		
1993–1994	Hapoel Ramat Gan		

Managerial career
- Hapoel Herzliya
- 2010: Maccabi Herzliya
- * Club domestic league appearances and goals

Danny Etzioni (Hebrew: דני עציוני) is a former Israeli footballer who is most famous for playing in Maccabi Netanya in the 1980s.

He now works as the general manager of Maccabi Herzliya youth team.

== Honours ==
- Israeli Premier League (1):
  - 1982–83
- League Cup (2):
  - 1982–83, 1983–84
- Israeli Supercup (1):
  - 1983
- UEFA Intertoto Cup (2):
  - 1983, 1984
- Israeli Second Division (1):
  - 1992–93
