= Efraim Davidi =

Israeli footballer

Personal information
- Date of birth: 15 August 1959 (age 67)
- Place of birth: Tehran, Iran
- Height: 1.80 m (5 ft 11 in)
- Position: Centre-back

Youth career
- Maccabi Be'er Sheva

Senior career*
| Years | Team | Apps | (Gls) |
| 1978–1990 | Hapoel Be'er Sheva | | |
| 1990–1992 | Tzafririm Holon | | |
| 1992–1995 | Hapoel Be'er Sheva | | |
| 1995–1996 | Maccabi Ironi Ashdod | | |
| 1996–2000 | Beitar Be'er Sheva | | |

International career
| 1983–1990 | Israel | 32 | (0) |
- * Club domestic league appearances and goals

Efraim Davidi (Hebrew: אפרים דוידי; born 15 August 1959) is an Israeli former professional footballer who played as a centre-back for Hapoel Be'er Sheva.

== Honours ==
Hapoel Beer Sheva

- Premier League third place: 1982–83, 1987–88, 1993–94, 1994–95
- State Cup runner-up: 1983–84
- Toto Cup: 1988–89; runner-up 1985–86
- Lillian Cup: 1988; runner-up 1982, 1983
