= Gad Machnes (footballer) =

Israeli footballer

Gad Machnes גד מכנס
Personal information
- Full name: Gad Machnes
- Date of birth: June 8, 1956 (age 70)
- Place of birth: Netanya, Israel
- Height: 5 ft 10 in (1.78 m)
- Position: Defender

Youth career
- Maccabi Netanya

Senior career*
Years	Team	Apps	(Gls)
1973–1983	Maccabi Netanya	187	(15)
1980–1981	Maccabi Petah Tikva (loan)		
1983–1984	Hapoel Tel Aviv		
1984–1987	Maccabi Petah Tikva		
1987–1989	Hapoel Hadera		
1989–1990	Beitar Netanya		

International career
1974–1984	Israel	21	(1)

Managerial career
- 2011–2013: Beitar Tubruk
- * Club domestic league appearances and goals

Gad Machnes
Medal record

Representing Israel

Football

Maccabiah Games
Gold medal – first place	1977 Maccabiah	Football

Gad Machnes (גד מכנס; born 8 June 1956) is a retired Israeli footballer.

== Soccer career ==
Machnes played as a defender for Maccabi Netanya, Maccabi Petah Tikva (loan), Hapoel Tel Aviv, Maccabi Petah Tikva, Hapoel Hadera, and Beitar Netanya. He earned a gold medal playing for Team Israel at the 1977 Maccabiah Games. He also played 21 caps for the Israel national football team from 1978 to 1985.

He worked as the manager of Beitar Tubruk in Liga Gimel.

== Honours ==
=== National ===
- Israeli Premier League (4):
  - 1973–74, 1977–78, 1979–80, 1982–83
- State Cup (1):
  - 1978
- Israeli Supercup (3):
  - 1978, 1980, 1983
- League Cup (2):
  - 1982–83, 1983–84

=== International ===
- UEFA Intertoto Cup (3):
  - 1978, 1980, 1983

== Personal life ==
Gad's twin brother Oded was a striker and both played together in Maccabi Netanya and in Maccabi Petah Tikva. His great-uncle was Israeli politician Gad Machnes, for whom he was named.
