= Mordechai Halfon =

Israeli footballer

Mordechai Halfon מרדכי חלפון
Personal information
- Full name: Mordechai "Pudi" Halfon
- Date of birth: March 9, 1957 (age 69)
- Place of birth: Israel
- Position: Midfielder

Youth career
- Maccabi Netanya

Senior career*
Years	Team	Apps	(Gls)
1975–1995	Maccabi Netanya	309	(15)
1984–1985	→ Bnei Yehuda (loan)		
1985–1986	→ Beitar Netanya (loan)		
1991–1992	→ Ironi Ashdod (loan)		

International career
1983	Israel	1	(0)
- * Club domestic league appearances and goals

Mordechai "Pudi" Halfon (Hebrew: מרדכי חלפון) is a former Israeli footballer who is mostly known for playing in Maccabi Netanya. He played for Netanya close to twenty years and won over 400 caps in all club competitions.

== Honours ==
- Israeli Premier League (3):
  - 1977-78, 1979–80, 1982–83
- Israel State Cup (1):
  - 1978
- League Cup (2):
  - 1982–83, 1983–84
- Israeli Supercup (3):
  - 1978, 1980, 1983
- UEFA Intertoto Cup (4):
  - 1978, 1980, 1983, 1984
- Liga Artzit (2):
  - 1984-85, 1985–86
