= Baruch Hassan =

Israeli footballer

Baruch Hassan ברוך חסן
Personal information
- Full name: Baruch Hassan
- Date of birth: 1959 (age 66–67)
- Place of birth: Netanya, Israel
- Position: Defender

Youth career
- Maccabi Netanya

Senior career*
Years	Team	Apps	(Gls)
1976–1987	Maccabi Netanya	221	(3)
1987–1990	Beitar Netanya		(0)

Managerial career
- 2005–2006: Beitar Nes Tubruk (U15)
- 2006–2008: Beitar Nes Tubruk (youth)
- 2010: Maccabi HaSharon Netanya
- * Club domestic league appearances and goals

Baruch Hassan (Hebrew: ברוך חסן; born 1959), is a former Israeli footballer who played in Maccabi Netanya and Beitar Netanya.

He is of Tunisian-Jewish origin.

== Career ==
Hassan was born to a family of Tunisian immigrants who settled in Netanya, and grew up in the youth team of Maccabi Netanya. He made his debut in the senior team's uniform in 1976, and quickly became a key player in the team. In the 1979/1980 and 1982/1983 seasons, he was one of the pillars of these championships that Maccabi Netanya won, and in addition he won the 1977/1978 State Cup with the team (which completed a historic double).

Hassan appeared in a total of 221 matches for Maccabi Netanya, scoring 3 goals for them, as he played for 12 seasons in the team's uniform and in 1988 he was loaned for two years to the Beitar Netanya team, where he played for the next 2 seasons, after which he retired from active football.

== Honours ==
- Israeli Premier League (2):
  - 1979–80, 1982–83
- League Cup (2):
  - 1982–83, 1983–84
- Israeli Supercup (2):
  - 1980, 1983
- UEFA Intertoto Cup (3):
  - 1980, 1983, 1984
