= Shlomo Shirazi =

Israeli footballer

Shlomo Shirazi שלמה שירזי
Personal information
- Full name: Shlomo Shirazi
- Date of birth: 20 June 1960 (age 66)
- Place of birth: Netanya, Israel
- Height: 5 ft 10 in (1.78 m)
- Position: Defender

Youth career
- Maccabi Netanya

Senior career*
Years	Team	Apps	(Gls)
1978–1979	Maccabi Netanya		
1979–1980	Maccabi Jaffa		
1980–1984	Maccabi Netanya		
1984–1990	Beitar Jerusalem		
1990–1991	Hapoel Rishon LeZion		

International career
1983–1985	Israel	11	(0)
- * Club domestic league appearances and goals

Shlomo Shirazi (Hebrew: שלמה שירזי; born 20 June 1960) is an Israeli former footballer. He played eleven times for the Israel national team.

== Honours ==
- Israeli Premier League (2):
  - 1982–83, 1986–87
- League Cup (2):
  - 1982–83, 1983–84
- Israeli Supercup (1):
  - 1983
- Israel State Cup (3):
  - 1985, 1986, 1989
