= Ronen Gabay =

Israeli footballer (born 1965)

Personal information
- Full name: Ronen Gabay
- Date of birth: 1965 (age 60–61)
- Place of birth: Netanya, Israel
- Position: Midfielder

Team information
- Current team: Maccabi Netanya

Youth career
- Maccabi Netanya

Senior career*
Years	Team	Apps	(Gls)
1983–1999	Maccabi Netanya	257	(31)
- → Maccabi Herzliya (loan)
- → Maccabi Jaffa (loan)
1995–1996	→ Hapoel Tel Aviv (loan)	6	(0)
- → Hapoel Hadera (loan)

Managerial career
- 2008–2014: Beitar Nes Tubruk
- 2014–2015: Maccabi Kabilio Jaffa
- 2015: Maccabi Netanya (assistant manager)
- 2015–2017: Maccabi Haifa (assistant manager)
- 2017–: Maccabi Netanya (U-20)
- * Club domestic league appearances and goals

Ronen Gabay (Hebrew: רונן גבאי; born 1965) is a former Israeli footballer who played in Maccabi Netanya throughout most of his career. He now works as the manager of the youth team of Netanya.

He previously worked as the manager of the highly successful youth team of Beitar Nes Tubruk.

On 27 December 2014, Gabay was appointed as the manager of Liga Alef club, Maccabi Kabilio Jaffa. However he left Jaffa after less than one month to become assistant manager at Maccabi Netanya.

On 1 May 2015, Gabay became the assistant manager at Maccabi Haifa.
