= Gad Machnes (politician) =

Israeli politician and businessman

Gad Machnes (Hebrew: גד מכנס; 13 August 1893 – 7 March 1954) was an Israeli politician and businessman. He was an orientalist in the Arab Affairs Department at the Jewish Agency as part of the Palestine Jewish Yishuv during the British Mandate of Palestine.

Machnes was born and raised in Petah Tikva and participated in Jewish pioneering efforts prior to Israeli independence. He was a member of the third transformation of the Israeli Transfer committee from August 1948 renamed as the Committee for Arab affairs along with Yosef Weitz, Ezra Danin, Yaacov Shimoni and Zalman Lifshiz. He became the Israeli Minority Affairs Ministry director general, Tel Aviv, in 1949. The Village files are still censored. Benei Binyamin, Petah Tikva, Hanotea, Netanya. Machnes was intimately involved with the Israeli government regularisation of the systematic appropriation of Abandoned Arab property and Transfer policy of the Yishuv. Machnes was one of David Ben-Gurion's most Hawkish advisers during the 1947–1948 Civil War in Mandatory Palestine and the following 1948 Arab–Israeli War.

Machnes has streets named after him in Netanya and Petah Tikva. Footballer Gad Machnes, the son of his brother Yitzhak, was named for him.
