= 1975–76 Liga Leumit =

Liga Leumit
- Season: 1975–76
- Champions: Hapoel Be'er Sheva; 2nd title
- Relegated: Hapoel Petah Tikva; Hapoel Hadera; Bnei Yehuda; Maccabi Ramat Amidar
- Top goalscorer: Oded Machnes (21)

The 1975–76 Liga Leumit season saw Hapoel Be'er Sheva win their second consecutive title. It was the only season to date in which the league had 18 clubs.

Four clubs, Hapoel Petah Tikva, Hapoel Hadera, Bnei Yehuda and Maccabi Ramat Amidar (in their first season in the top division) were relegated as the league was reduced to 16 clubs the following season.

Oded Machnes of Maccabi Netanya was the league's top scorer of 21 goals.

== Final table ==
Pos	Team	Pld	W	D	L	GF	GA	GD	Pts	Qualification or relegation
1	Hapoel Be'er Sheva (C)	34	14	14	6	40	29	+11	42	Qualification for the Intertoto Cup
2	Beitar Jerusalem	34	12	16	6	48	32	+16	40	Qualification for the Intertoto Cup
3	Hapoel Haifa	34	13	12	9	30	24	+6	38	
4	Maccabi Netanya	34	14	9	11	58	39	+19	37	
5	Hapoel Kfar Saba	34	11	14	9	35	27	+8	36	
6	Shimshon Tel Aviv	34	10	16	8	44	36	+8	36	
7	Maccabi Tel Aviv	34	13	9	12	38	34	+4	35	
8	Maccabi Petah Tikva	34	12	11	11	37	36	+1	35	
9	Maccabi Haifa	34	10	15	9	28	27	+1	35	
10	Hapoel Tel Aviv	34	12	11	11	28	28	0	35	
11	Maccabi Jaffa	34	10	15	9	28	30	−2	35	
12	Beitar Tel Aviv	34	12	11	11	28	33	−5	35	
13	Hapoel Jerusalem	34	12	10	12	39	39	0	34	
14	Hakoah Ramat Gan	34	10	14	10	30	34	−4	34	
15	Hapoel Petah Tikva (R)	34	10	13	11	27	28	−1	33	Relegated to Liga Artzit
16	Hapoel Hadera (R)	34	6	13	15	20	44	−24	25	Relegated to Liga Artzit
17	Bnei Yehuda (R)	34	6	12	16	26	48	−22	24	Relegated to Liga Artzit
18	Maccabi Ramat Amidar (R)	34	6	11	17	24	40	−16	23	Relegated to Liga Artzit

Source: rsssf.com
(C) Champions; (R) Relegated

== Results ==
Home \ Away	BEI	BTA	BnY	HAR	HBS	HAH	HHA	HJE	HKS	HPT	HTA	MHA	MJA	MNE	MPT	MRA	MTA	STA
Beitar Jerusalem	—	0–1	3–1	3–0	0–2	1–0	0–1	4–1	0–0	1–0	0–0	0–0	4–1	1–1	1–1	1–0	2–0	2–2
Beitar Tel Aviv	0–3	—	2–1	2–1	1–1	1–1	0–0	1–1	1–0	0–0	0–2	1–1	0–0	1–0	1–0	2–0	2–0	0–3
Bnei Yehuda	1–3	0–2	—	0–1	1–1	2–2	0–0	0–2	0–0	0–0	2–1	1–1	2–0	1–0	0–1	1–1	2–1	1–1
Hakoah Ramat Gan	1–1	1–2	1–2	—	1–0	1–0	1–0	0–0	0–0	2–1	1–0	0–0	1–1	1–1	2–2	2–1	1–0	2–2
Hapoel Be'er Sheva	1–1	1–1	2–2	0–0	—	0–0	1–0	4–0	2–1	0–0	0–0	1–0	0–1	0–0	2–1	3–1	1–0	4–2
Hapoel Hadera	2–4	1–0	0–1	0–4	3–0	—	0–0	0–5	1–1	1–1	0–0	0–2	0–0	2–1	0–2	1–0	1–1	0–1
Hapoel Haifa	1–0	1–2	2–0	1–1	1–0	2–1	—	1–0	1–1	1–1	0–1	2–1	1–1	1–0	1–0	3–0	2–1	2–1
Hapoel Jerusalem	1–1	0–0	2–0	2–0	1–3	1–1	2–1	—	1–1	0–0	1–3	1–0	0–0	3–0	4–0	1–0	1–2	0–0
Hapoel Kfar Saba	1–1	2–1	0–0	1–0	1–2	2–0	2–0	1–2	—	1–0	1–0	4–0	1–0	1–1	0–2	1–1	1–1	1–0
Hapoel Petah Tikva	0–0	2–0	2–1	1–0	0–1	2–0	0–0	1–2	1–0	—	0–2	1–1	2–0	2–1	0–2	1–1	2–0	0–1
Hapoel Tel Aviv	1–1	0–1	0–0	1–1	1–0	1–0	1–1	3–2	0–4	1–2	—	2–1	1–0	0–1	2–0	1–0	2–1	0–0
Maccabi Haifa	3–3	1–0	3–0	0–0	1–1	0–1	0–0	2–0	0–0	2–2	1–0	—	1–0	1–0	0–2	1–1	1–1	1–0
Maccabi Jaffa	1–1	1–0	1–1	0–0	2–2	2–0	1–0	2–0	2–1	0–0	0–0	0–1	—	1–3	0–2	0–0	2–0	0–0
Maccabi Netanya	1–1	3–1	2–0	4–2	4–1	5–0	2–1	1–2	4–1	0–0	1–0	1–1	2–3	—	5–1	3–0	1–2	2–2
Maccabi Petah Tikva	2–2	2–0	2–1	0–1	0–1	0–0	1–1	2–0	0–0	3–0	2–1	0–0	2–3	0–3	—	0–0	1–0	0–0
Maccabi Ramat Amidar	0–1	0–0	3–0	2–0	0–1	0–0	1–0	2–0	1–3	3–1	0–0	1–0	0–1	1–1	1–1	—	0–1	1–2
Maccabi Tel Aviv	2–0	3–1	2–0	4–1	1–1	1–2	0–0	1–1	1–0	0–2	0–0	1–0	1–1	5–2	2–1	1–0	—	2–0
Shimshon Tel Aviv	3–2	1–1	4–2	0–0	1–1	0–0	1–2	2–0	1–1	1–0	4–1	0–1	1–1	0–2	2–2	6–2	0–0	—

Legend: Blue = home team win; Yellow = draw; Red = away team win.
