= David Lavi =

Israeli footballer

David Lavi דוד לביא
Personal information
- Full name: David Lavi
- Date of birth: 9 February 1956 (age 70)
- Place of birth: Netanya, Israel
- Position: Striker

Youth career
- Maccabi Netanya

Senior career*
| Years | Team | Apps | (Gls) |
| 1973–1986 | Maccabi Netanya | 319 | (142) |
| 1986–1988 | Beitar Tel Aviv | 41 | (16) |
| 1988–1993 | Maccabi HaShikma Ramat Hen | 55 | (20) |

International career
| 1978 | Israel | 2 | (0) |

Managerial career
- 1994: Maccabi Netanya
- * Club domestic league appearances and goals

David Lavi (Hebrew: דוד לביא) is a retired Israeli footballer who is one of the top ten goal-scorers in Israeli history with 158 goals in the Israeli Premier League.

== Honours ==
=== National ===
- Israeli Premier League (3):
  - 1977/78, 1979/80, 1982/83
- State Cup (1):
  - 1977/78
- League Cup (2):
  - 1982/83, 1983/84

=== International ===
- UEFA Intertoto Cup (3):
  - 1978, 1980, 1983

=== Individual ===
- Israeli Premier League - Top Goalscorer (4):
  - 1977/78, 1979/80, 1983/84, 1984/85
