= Oded Machnes =

Israeli footballer (born 1956)

Personal information
- Full name: Oded Machnes
- Date of birth: 8 June 1956 (age 70)
- Place of birth: Netanya, Israel
- Height: 1.78 m (5 ft 10 in)
- Position: Striker

Youth career
- Maccabi Netanya

Senior career*
Years	Team	Apps	(Gls)
1973–1988	Maccabi Netanya	329	(166)
1984–1985	→ Maccabi Petah Tikva (loan)	28	(15)
1986	→ Maccabi Petah Tikva (loan)	15	(2)
1986–1987	→ Maccabi Tel Aviv (loan)	13	(3)
1987	→ Hapoel Hadera (loan)	13	(2)
1988–1989	Hapoel Tiberias	24	(6)
1989–1990	Hapoel Tzafririm Holon	10	(2)
Total		432	(196)

International career
1974–1984	Israel	14	(3)

Managerial career
- 1995: Maccabi Netanya
- * Club domestic league appearances and goals

Oded Machnes (Hebrew: עודד מכנס; born 8 June 1956) is an Israeli retired footballer who was a striker. He is the second-greatest goal-scorer in Israeli history with 196 goals in the Israeli Premier League.

== Honours ==
=== National ===
- Israeli Premier League (4):
  - 1973–74, 1977–78, 1979–80, 1982–83
- State Cup (1):
  - 1977-78
- Israeli Supercup (4):
  - 1973-74, 1977–78, 1979–80, 1982-83

=== International ===
- UEFA Intertoto Cup (3):
  - 1978, 1980, 1983

=== Individual ===
- Israeli Premier League – Top Goalscorer (4):
  - 1975–76, 1978–79, 1981–82, 1982–83
- Israeli Footballer of the Year (3):
  - 1977-78, 1981–82, 1982–83

== Personal life ==
Oded's twin brother Gad was a defender and both played together in Maccabi Netanya and in Maccabi Petah Tikva.
