= Hapoel Yehud F.C. =

Hapoel Yehud
- Full name: Hapoel Yehud Football Club
- Founded: 1950
- Dissolved: 1998
- Ground: Hapoel Stadium, Yehud
- 1997–98: Liga Alef South, 16th (Relegated)
Home colours	Away colours

Hapoel Yehud (Hebrew: הפועל יהוד) was an Israeli football club based in Yehud. They spent eight seasons in the top division in the late 1970s and early 1980s, and won the State Cup in 1982.

== History ==
The club was founded in 1950. In 1973 they won the 25 Years of Independence Cup for Liga Alef clubs, beating Hapoel Ramat Gan 2–0 in the final.

The club was first promoted to the top division as Liga Alef champions in 1976. In their first season in Liga Leumit they finished 7th. The following season they finished fourth, a performance repeated in 1979–80. In 1981–82 they narrowly avoided relegation, finishing one place above the drop zone. In the same season the club reached the final of the State Cup for the first (and only) time, where they beat Hapoel Tel Aviv 1–0.

However, two seasons later, the club finished bottom of the table and were relegated to Liga Artzit. In 1989 they dropped into Liga Alef (then the third tier), and in 1992 were relegated to Liga Bet. Although they briefly returned to Liga Alef, the club was relegated back to Liga Bet, and folded in 1998.

During their years in the top division the club became well known for its defensive style of play, referred to in Hebrew as "bunker", and specialisation in 0–0 draws. In all but their final season in Liga Leumit the club drew more matches than it won or lost, and had a consistently good defensive record (the best defence in 1980–81 and the second best in 1976–77 and 1981–82). The club is still remembered for its lack of goal action and low-scoring football tournaments are met with the comment "Hapoel Yehud scores more".

In 2004 a new club, Hapoel Monosson Yehud, was established and played in Liga Gimel. However, the club was expelled from the league due to player registration infringements. Another new club, Hapoel Ironi Yehud, was formed in 2008 and played in Liga Gimel. The new club merged with local rivals Bnei Yehud in 2009.

== Honours ==
=== League ===
Honour	No.	Years
Second tier	1	1975–76
Third tier	2	1966–68, 1969–70

=== Cups ===
Honour	No.	Years
State Cup	1	1981–82
25th Anniversary Cup (second tier)	1	1973
