= 1982–83 Liga Leumit =

Liga Leumit
- Season: 1982–83
- Champions: Maccabi Netanya; 5th title
- Relegated: Hapoel Ramat Gan; Hapoel Jerusalem; Hapoel Kfar Saba
- Top goalscorer: Oded Machnes (22)

The 1982–83 Liga Leumit season saw Maccabi Netanya win the title, with the club's Oded Machnes finishing as the league's top scorer with 22 goals. Hapoel Ramat Gan, Hapoel Jerusalem and Hapoel Kfar Saba (who finished bottom of the league a year after winning the title) were relegated to Liga Artzit. It was also the first season that the Three points for a win system was introduced.

== Final table ==
Pos	Team	Pld	W	D	L	GF	GA	GD	Pts	Qualification or relegation
1	Maccabi Netanya (C)	30	18	7	5	54	31	+23	61	Qualification for the Intertoto Cup
2	Shimshon Tel Aviv	30	12	11	7	35	27	+8	47	Qualification for the Intertoto Cup
3	Hapoel Be'er Sheva	30	11	13	6	33	23	+10	46	
4	Hapoel Tel Aviv	30	13	7	10	33	26	+7	46	
5	Maccabi Tel Aviv	30	10	11	9	27	23	+4	41	
6	Maccabi Haifa	30	8	14	8	31	31	0	38	
7	Hapoel Lod	30	7	15	8	33	28	+5	36	
8	Beitar Jerusalem	30	7	15	8	34	33	+1	36	
9	Maccabi Petah Tikva	30	8	12	10	25	30	−5	36	
10	Maccabi Yavne	30	7	15	8	25	31	−6	36	
11	Hapoel Yehud	30	8	12	10	18	26	−8	36	
12	Bnei Yehuda	30	7	15	8	26	35	−9	36	
13	Maccabi Jaffa	30	6	15	9	22	24	−2	33	
14	Hapoel Ramat Gan (R)	30	6	15	9	15	21	−6	33	Relegated to Liga Artzit
15	Hapoel Jerusalem (R)	30	8	7	15	29	44	−15	31	Relegated to Liga Artzit
16	Hapoel Kfar Saba (R)	30	6	12	12	33	40	−7	30	Relegated to Liga Artzit

Source: rsssf.com
(C) Champions; (R) Relegated

== Results ==
Home \ Away	BEI	BnY	HBS	HKS	HJE	HLD	HRG	HTA	HYE	MHA	MJA	MNE	MPT	MTA	MYV	STA
Beitar Jerusalem	—	2–1	0–1	1–0	2–1	1–1	1–1	1–1	0–1	1–1	3–0	1–1	2–1	1–1	1–1	3–3
Bnei Yehuda	2–0	—	2–2	0–0	2–0	1–1	2–0	1–0	0–0	1–0	1–1	0–0	0–0	0–2	2–1	1–1
Hapoel Be'er Sheva	1–0	1–0	—	0–0	4–0	2–1	0–0	0–0	0–1	2–0	1–1	0–2	1–1	3–0	3–1	3–0
Hapoel Kfar Saba	3–1	0–0	1–0	—	3–3	2–2	0–1	3–1	2–0	1–2	1–2	3–2	1–1	0–0	1–1	0–2
Hapoel Jerusalem	0–2	3–0	2–2	2–0	—	0–2	1–0	3–0	2–0	0–0	0–2	1–1	2–0	1–4	1–1	1–0
Hapoel Lod	3–3	3–0	0–0	2–2	0–1	—	1–0	1–0	4–0	1–1	0–0	1–4	0–0	0–1	3–0	0–0
Hapoel Ramat Gan	1–1	0–0	0–0	0–0	0–0	0–0	—	0–1	1–0	0–3	1–0	0–1	2–0	1–1	0–0	1–1
Hapoel Tel Aviv	0–2	7–1	2–3	3–2	3–1	2–1	3–0	—	1–0	1–0	0–0	0–0	1–0	0–0	2–0	1–0
Hapoel Yehud	0–0	0–0	0–0	3–1	2–0	0–0	0–1	1–1	—	1–1	0–0	0–2	1–0	1–0	0–1	0–0
Maccabi Haifa	0–0	3–3	1–1	0–0	1–0	2–1	1–1	1–2	2–1	—	0–0	3–0	2–5	0–2	1–0	0–1
Maccabi Jaffa	1–1	2–2	0–1	0–2	3–1	0–1	1–1	0–0	0–1	2–0	—	0–2	0–0	0–0	3–0	1–2
Maccabi Netanya	3–2	3–1	1–1	4–2	3–2	1–0	2–1	2–0	4–1	1–1	0–1	—	2–0	2–0	1–0	3–1
Maccabi Petah Tikva	1–0	0–1	3–1	3–1	0–0	1–1	0–0	1–0	1–1	0–0	0–0	2–2	—	2–0	0–1	1–0
Maccabi Tel Aviv	0–0	0–0	2–0	1–0	2–1	1–1	0–2	0–1	1–2	0–2	1–0	0–1	5–0	—	0–0	0–0
Maccabi Yavne	1–1	0–0	0–0	1–1	1–0	2–1	0–0	1–0	0–0	3–3	1–1	4–3	0–1	2–2	—	0–0
Shimshon Tel Aviv	2–1	3–2	2–0	2–1	4–0	1–1	1–0	1–0	1–1	0–0	1–1	3–1	3–1	0–1	0–2	—

Legend: Blue = home team win; Yellow = draw; Red = away team win.
