= Israel Super Cup =

Israel Super Cup אלוף האלופים
- Founded: 1957
- Region: Israel
- Teams: 2
- Current champions: Maccabi Tel Aviv (9 titles)
- Most championships: Maccabi Tel Aviv (9 titles)
- 2026 Israel Super Cup

The Israel Super Cup, also known as the Champion of Champions (Hebrew: אלוף האלופים, Aluf HaAlufim), is an Israeli association football club competition played as a single match between the winner of the latest Israeli top league champions and the winner of the latest Israel State Cup. If a team won both the championship and the state cup, their designated rival for the Super Cup match was the league runner-up.

The cup was first contested in 1957, but the title was an informal title, not sanctioned by the IFA Until 1969. As an IFA sanctioned competition, the competition was played annually, except for 1972, 1973 and 1987 until its cancellation in 1990.

Between 1969 and 1971 The IFA also sanctioned a "Champion of Champions" match for Liga Alef, which was played between the two regional winners of Liga Alef. The match was played once more, at the end of the 1975–76 season, and was discontinued after the establishment of Liga Artzit.

The most successful club is Maccabi Tel Aviv with 8 wins.

In March 2014 the IFA announced the renewal of the competition.

== History ==
The title was first contested in 1957 in a match between League winners, Hapoel Tel Aviv and Cup winners, Hapoel Petah Tikva. The cup, which wasn't sanctioned by the IFA, was named after Lt-Col Zivi Tzafriri and was won by Hapoel Tel Aviv, who had beaten its rivals 3–0.

The Next time the competition was contested, in 1963, the cup was donated by Ilanshil-Polio, an Israeli organization dedicated to aid Poliomyelitis victims, with proceedings going towards the organization. In the match, Hapoel Petah Tikva and Maccabi Haifa have drawn 2–2.

Starting from the 1964–65 season, the match was played in each season until 1990, except for 1972, 1973 and 1987. The IFA decided upon making the cup an official title at the beginning of the 1968–69 season, set it to be played at the beginning of each season and ruled that in case of a club winning both the league championship and the cup, their designated rival for the Super Cup match would be the league runner-up. The IFA also set a "Champion of Champions" match for Liga Alef, to be played between the two divisional winners. The first Liga Alef Super Cup was played between Maccabi Petah Tikva and Beitar Tel Aviv in June 1969, the former winning 3–0.

In 1979, the cup was named after Israeli sports broadcaster Nehemia Ben Avraham following Ben Avraham's death.

In March 2014 the IFA announced the renewal of the competition. However, the match planned for the beginning of the 2014–15 season was cancelled, with the intent to play it the next season.

The competition was renewed in August 2015.

== Liga Leumit Super Cup ==
=== Winners ===
==== Unofficial Competitions ====
Year	League Winner	Cup Winner	Score
1957	Hapoel Tel Aviv	Hapoel Petah Tikva	3–0
1962	Hapoel Petah Tikva	Maccabi Haifa	2–2 (Note: Cup was Shared.)
1965	Hakoah Ramat Gan	Maccabi Tel Aviv	2–2 / 1–1 (R)
1966	Hapoel Tel Aviv	Hapoel Haifa	2–1
1968	Maccabi Tel Aviv	Bnei Yehuda	2–1

==== Official Competitions ====
Year	League Winner	Cup Winner	Score
1969	Hapoel Tel Aviv	Hakoah Ramat Gan	5–1
1970	Maccabi Tel Aviv	Hapoel Tel Aviv^{ru}	1–2
1971	Maccabi Netanya	Hakoah Ramat Gan	4–2 (a.e.t.)
1972–1973	Not Held		
1974	Maccabi Netanya	Hapoel Haifa	2–1
1975	Hapoel Be'er Sheva	Hapoel Kfar Saba	2–1
1976	Hapoel Be'er Sheva	Beitar Jerusalem	2–3 (a.e.t.)
1977	Maccabi Tel Aviv	Maccabi Jaffa^{ru}	3–2
1978	Maccabi Netanya	Beitar Jerusalem^{ru}	4–0
1979	Maccabi Tel Aviv	Beitar Jerusalem	2–0
1980	Maccabi Netanya	Hapoel Kfar Saba	2–1
1981	Hapoel Tel Aviv	Bnei Yehuda	1–0
1982	Hapoel Kfar Saba	Hapoel Yehud	3–3 (a.e.t.) 3–2 (p)
1983	Maccabi Netanya	Hapoel Tel Aviv	1–0
1984	Maccabi Haifa	Hapoel Lod	1–4
1985	Maccabi Haifa	Beitar Jerusalem	5–2
1986	Hapoel Tel Aviv	Beitar Jerusalem	1–2
1987	Not Held		
1988	Hapoel Tel Aviv	Maccabi Tel Aviv	0–3
1989	Maccabi Haifa	Beitar Jerusalem	2–1
1990	Bnei Yehuda	Hapoel Kfar Saba	1–0
1991–2014	Not Held		
2015	Maccabi Tel Aviv	Ironi Kiryat Shmona^{ru}	2–2 (a.e.t.) 4–5 (p)
2016	Hapoel Be'er Sheva	Maccabi Haifa	4–2
2017	Hapoel Be'er Sheva	Bnei Yehuda	4–2
2018	Hapoel Be'er Sheva	Hapoel Haifa	1–1 (FT) 4–5 (p)
2019	Maccabi Tel Aviv	Bnei Yehuda	1–0
2020	Maccabi Tel Aviv	Hapoel Be'er Sheva	2–0, 2–0
2021	Maccabi Haifa	Maccabi Tel Aviv	2–0
2022	Maccabi Haifa	Hapoel Be'er Sheva	1–1 (FT) 3–4 (p)
2023	Maccabi Haifa	Beitar Jerusalem	3–1
2024	Maccabi Tel Aviv	Maccabi Petah Tikva	2–0
2025	Maccabi Tel Aviv	Hapoel Be'er Sheva	1–2
2026	Hapoel Be'er Sheva	Maccabi Tel Aviv	1–3

Note: ^{ru} Indicate that the team was Runner-up and played for the Super Cup as the League Champion won this season's Double.

=== Performance by club ===
Club	Winners	Runner-up
Maccabi Tel Aviv	8	4
Hapoel Tel Aviv	5	4
Maccabi Haifa	5	3
Hapoel Be'er Sheva	5	3
Maccabi Netanya	5	—
Beitar Jerusalem	2	5
Bnei Yehuda	1	4
Hapoel Kfar Saba	1	3
Hapoel Haifa	1	2
Hakoah Ramat Gan	1	2
Hapoel Petah Tikva	1	1
Hapoel Lod	1	—
Ironi Kiryat Shmona	1	—
Hapoel Yehud	—	1
Maccabi Jaffa	—	1
Maccabi Petah Tikva	—	1

== Liga Alef Super Cup ==
Year	North Division Winner	South Division Winner	Score
1968–69	Maccabi Petah Tikva	Beitar Tel Aviv	3–0
1969–70	Hapoel Hadera	Hapoel Holon	0–1 (Note: The first match between the teams ended in a 2–2 draw after extra time, after which the crowd entered the pitch and prevented the teams from taking the penalties.)
1970–71	Maccabi Jaffa	Hapoel Be'er Sheva	2–2 (a.e.t.) 2–3 (p.)
1975–76	Hapoel Acre	Hapoel Yehud	1–0
