= 1979–80 Liga Leumit =

Liga Leumit
- Season: 1979–80
- Champions: Maccabi Netanya; 4th title
- Relegated: Hakoah Ramat Gan; Beitar Tel Aviv; Beitar Jerusalem
- Top goalscorer: David Lavi (18)

The 1979–80 Liga Leumit season saw Maccabi Netanya, with the club's David Lavi finishing as the league's top scorer with 18 goals. Hakoah Ramat Gan, Beitar Tel Aviv and Beitar Jerusalem were all relegated to Liga Artzit.

== Final table ==
Pos	Team	Pld	W	D	L	GF	GA	GD	Pts	Qualification or relegation
1	Maccabi Netanya (C)	30	19	8	3	53	23	+30	46	Qualification for the Intertoto Cup
2	Hapoel Tel Aviv	30	10	16	4	28	19	+9	36	
3	Shimshon Tel Aviv	30	11	10	9	33	24	+9	32	
4	Hapoel Yehud	30	10	12	8	26	24	+2	32	
5	Maccabi Tel Aviv	30	9	14	7	33	35	−2	32	Qualification for the Intertoto Cup
6	Bnei Yehuda	30	10	11	9	33	28	+5	31	
7	Hapoel Kfar Saba	30	10	11	9	30	26	+4	31	
8	Maccabi Petah Tikva	30	11	8	11	32	34	−2	30	
9	Hapoel Petah Tikva	30	8	12	10	21	34	−13	28	
10	Hapoel Be'er Sheva	30	7	13	10	28	27	+1	27	
11	Maccabi Ramat Amidar	30	6	15	9	21	20	+1	27	
12	Hapoel Haifa	30	8	11	11	22	33	−11	27	
13	Maccabi Jaffa	30	7	12	11	33	35	−2	26	
14	Hakoah Ramat Gan (R)	30	7	12	11	27	36	−9	26	Relegated to Liga Artzit
15	Beitar Tel Aviv (R)	30	7	12	11	27	39	−12	26	Relegated to Liga Artzit
16	Beitar Jerusalem (R)	30	4	15	11	15	25	−10	23	Relegated to Liga Artzit

Source: rsssf.com
(C) Champions; (R) Relegated

== Results ==
Home \ Away	BEI	BTA	BnY	HAR	HBS	HHA	HKS	HPT	HTA	HYE	MJA	MNE	MPT	MRA	MTA	STA
Beitar Jerusalem	—	0–1	0–2	3–1	2–1	1–0	1–1	2–2	0–1	0–0	2–2	0–1	0–1	0–0	0–0	1–1
Beitar Tel Aviv	0–0	—	0–0	0–0	1–0	3–1	1–0	0–2	1–1	1–2	1–1	2–1	0–3	0–0	1–1	1–4
Bnei Yehuda	1–0	2–1	—	1–1	1–0	2–2	3–0	0–1	0–0	2–0	2–0	1–1	3–2	0–1	0–0	1–1
Hakoah Ramat Gan	1–0	2–1	0–1	—	0–0	1–0	0–0	2–0	0–0	2–3	0–0	1–3	4–2	0–0	4–1	1–3
Hapoel Be'er Sheva	1–1	3–1	0–0	2–3	—	4–1	1–1	1–2	1–1	0–0	2–1	1–0	4–0	1–1	1–1	0–0
Hapoel Haifa	0–0	0–0	1–0	0–0	1–1	—	1–0	4–0	0–0	1–0	0–3	0–2	0–0	0–0	1–0	1–5
Hapoel Kfar Saba	2–1	1–2	3–1	2–1	1–0	3–0	—	0–0	0–1	1–1	1–0	1–1	0–1	1–1	0–1	2–1
Hapoel Petah Tikva	0–0	2–1	0–3	0–0	0–0	2–0	0–2	—	1–1	0–0	0–0	0–0	1–5	1–0	2–3	0–2
Hapoel Tel Aviv	0–0	3–3	2–0	0–0	0–1	0–2	2–1	2–0	—	0–1	1–1	0–0	3–0	0–0	0–0	1–0
Hapoel Yehud	0–1	0–0	1–0	0–0	0–0	2–0	0–0	0–1	1–2	—	2–1	1–2	2–1	2–1	1–1	1–0
Maccabi Jaffa	0–0	3–1	1–1	3–2	1–0	0–0	1–3	1–1	0–1	2–2	—	0–1	1–1	0–0	3–0	0–1
Maccabi Netanya	2–0	5–2	3–1	6–0	4–1	2–1	2–1	2–0	1–0	2–2	4–2	—	2–0	1–1	1–4	1–0
Maccabi Petah Tikva	0–0	1–2	1–0	2–0	1–0	1–1	1–1	0–0	2–2	1–0	1–0	0–1	—	1–0	1–2	0–1
Maccabi Ramat Amidar	2–0	1–0	1–1	0–0	0–1	0–0	0–0	1–0	0–1	1–1	4–0	1–2	3–1	—	0–1	0–2
Maccabi Tel Aviv	0–0	0–0	4–4	1–0	2–1	1–3	1–1	0–1	2–2	1–0	1–3	0–0	1–1	2–1	—	1–2
Shimshon Tel Aviv	2–0	0–0	1–0	2–1	0–0	0–1	0–1	2–2	1–1	0–1	0–3	0–0	0–1	1–1	1–1	—

Legend: Blue = home team win; Yellow = draw; Red = away team win.
