= 1983 Intertoto Cup =

Tournament details
- Teams: 40

Final positions
- Champions: Group winners Twente; Young Boys; Pogoń Szczecin; Maccabi Netanya; Sloboda Tuzla; Bohemians Prague; IFK Göteborg; Hammarby; Videoton; Vítkovice

Tournament statistics
- Matches played: 120

In the 1983 Intertoto Cup no knock-out rounds were contested, and therefore no overall winner was declared.

== Group stage ==
The 40 competing teams were divided into ten groups of four teams each.

=== Group 1 ===
Table

Pos	Team	Pld	W	D	L	GF	GA	GD	Pts	TWE	STA	ZÜR	DÜS
1	(Netherlands) Twente	6	4	1	1	14	10	+4	9	—	2–0	1–1	1–0
2	(Belgium) Standard Liège	6	4	0	2	13	9	+4	8	4–2	—	3–0	4–3
3	(Switzerland) Zürich	6	2	2	2	13	13	0	6	3–4	2–1	—	5–2
4	(West Germany) Fortuna Düsseldorf	6	0	1	5	9	17	−8	1	2–4	0–1	2–2	—

Source: mogiel.net
Rules for classification: 1) Points; 2) Goal difference; 3) Goals scored; 4) Head-to-head points; 5) Away goals scored; 6) Draw.

Matches

2 July 1983

Fortuna Düsseldorf (West Germany)	2–2	(Switzerland) Zürich
Wenzel 27' (1:1) (Baur) 48' (o.g.)	FCZ summary	26' (0:1) Alliata; 75' (pen.) Zappa; (yellow card) Schönenberger; (yellow card) Stoll

Ratingen
Attendance: 4,000
Referee: (West Germany) Ahlenfelder

7 July 1983

Fortuna Düsseldorf (West Germany)	2–4	(Belgium) Standard Liège
Goal		Goal

Esprit Arena, Düsseldorf

7 July 1983

Twente (Netherlands)	1–1	(Switzerland) Zürich
Ashcroft 87' (1:1)	FCZ summary Twente report	77' (0:1) Elsener

Diekman Stadion, Enschede
Attendance: 4,000
Referee: (Netherlands) Jan Manuel

9 July 1983

Fortuna Düsseldorf (West Germany)	2–4	(Netherlands) FC Twente
Günter Thiele 26'; Atli Eðvaldsson 42'	Report	Evert Bleuming 27'; Martin Koopman 63' (pen.); Rini Plasmans 70'; André van Benthem 79'

Esprit Arena, Düsseldorf
Attendance: 4,000

9 July 1983

Standard Liège (Belgium)	3–0	(Switzerland) Zürich
Plessers 57' (1:0); Tahamata 86' (2:0); Daerden 89' (3:0)	FCZ summary	(yellow card) Kundert

Stade de Sclessin, Liège
Attendance: 6,000
Referee: (Belgium) Richard Magerat

13 July 1983

FC Twente (Netherlands)	2–0	(Belgium) Standard Liège
Martin Koopman 9' (pen.); René Roord 73'	Report

Diekman Stadion, Enschede
Attendance: 8,000

16 July 1983

Standard Liège (Belgium)	4–3	(West Germany) Fortuna Düsseldorf
Goal		Goal

Stade Maurice Dufrasne, Liège

16 July 1983

Zürich (Switzerland)	3–4	(Netherlands) Twente
Jerković 3' (1:0); Kundert (yellow card) 7'; Zappa 28' (2:0); Bold 31' (3:1)	FCZ summary Twente report	30' (2:1) Birkedal; (yellow card) 42' Plasmans; 58' (3:2) Rutten; 77' (3:3) Roord; 83' (3:4) Plasmans

Letzigrund, Zürich
Attendance: 1,800
Referee: (Switzerland) Rudolf Renggli (Stans/Luzern)

23 July 1983

Standard Liège (Belgium)	4–2	(Netherlands) FC Twente
Rini Plasmans 15'	Report

Stade Maurice Dufrasne, Liège

23 July 1983

Zürich (Switzerland)	5–2	(West Germany) Fortuna Düsseldorf
Bold 16' (1:0); Bold 28' (2:1); Alliata 49' (3:1); Alliata 51' (4:2); Landolt 89' (5:2)	FCZ summary	24' (1:1) Bockenfeld; 51' (4:2) Eðvaldsson; (yellow card) 88' Dusend

Letzigrund, Zürich
Attendance: 1,700
Referee: (Switzerland) Franz Gächter (Aarau / Suhr)

27 July 1983

Zürich (Switzerland)	2–1	(Belgium) Standard Liège
Bold 48' (1:0); Schneider 79' (2:0)	FCZ summary	(yellow card) 35' Delangre; (yellow card) 36' Bosman; (yellow card) 79' Preud'homme; 87' (2:1) Wintacq

Letzigrund, Zürich
Attendance: 2,700
Referee: (Switzerland) Jakob Baumann (Schaffhausen)

30 July 1983

FC Twente (Netherlands)	1–0	(Belgium) Standard Liège
Martin Koopman 9' (pen.); René Roord 73'	Report

Sportpark De Morgenzon, Winterswijk

=== Group 2 ===
Pos	Team	Pld	W	D	L	GF	GA	GD	Pts	YB	SLP	BRØ	SLS
1	(Switzerland) Young Boys	6	4	0	2	7	6	+1	8	—	2–1	0–2	1–0
2	(Czechoslovakia) Slavia Prague	6	3	0	3	12	8	+4	6	2–1	—	3–1	5–0
3	(Denmark) Brøndby	6	2	1	3	7	8	−1	5	1–2	2–0	—	0–0
4	(Bulgaria) Slavia Sofia	6	2	1	3	5	9	−4	5	0–1	2–1	3–1	—

Source: mogiel.net
Rules for classification: 1) Points; 2) Goal difference; 3) Goals scored; 4) Head-to-head points; 5) Away goals scored; 6) Draw.

=== Group 3 ===
Pos	Team	Pld	W	D	L	GF	GA	GD	Pts	PSZ	BRE	MAL	STG
1	(Poland) Pogoń Szczecin	6	3	2	1	10	10	0	8	—	2–1	2–0	1–1
2	(West Germany) Werder Bremen	6	3	1	2	12	8	+4	7	4–0	—	1–1	3–2
3	(Sweden) Malmö FF	6	2	1	3	7	9	−2	5	1–2	2–1	—	2–0
4	(Switzerland) St. Gallen	6	1	2	3	10	12	−2	4	3–3	1–2	3–1	—

Source: mogiel.net
Rules for classification: 1) Points; 2) Goal difference; 3) Goals scored; 4) Head-to-head points; 5) Away goals scored; 6) Draw.

=== Group 4 ===
Pos	Team	Pld	W	D	L	GF	GA	GD	Pts	MNE	AGF	LUZ	STA
1	(Israel) Maccabi Netanya	6	5	0	1	17	10	+7	10	—	3–1	6–3	3–0
2	(Denmark) AGF	6	3	0	3	14	11	+3	6	1–2	—	8–3	2–1
3	(Switzerland) Luzern	6	2	1	3	12	17	−5	5	4–1	1–0	—	1–2
4	(Israel) Shimshon Tel Aviv	6	1	1	4	5	10	−5	3	1–2	1–2	0–0	—

Source: mogiel.net
Rules for classification: 1) Points; 2) Goal difference; 3) Goals scored; 4) Head-to-head points; 5) Away goals scored; 6) Draw.

=== Group 5 ===
Pos	Team	Pld	W	D	L	GF	GA	GD	Pts	SLO	HON	BRA	WAC
1	(Socialist Federal Republic of Yugoslavia) Sloboda Tuzla	6	4	1	1	10	6	+4	9	—	1–0	2–0	2–1
2	(Hungary) Budapest Honvéd	6	2	2	2	10	8	+2	6	2–2	—	3–1	3–1
3	(Czechoslovakia) Inter Bratislava	6	2	1	3	8	11	−3	5	2–1	1–1	—	2–1
4	(Austria) SSW Innsbruck	6	2	0	4	9	12	−3	4	1–2	2–1	3–2	—

Source: mogiel.net
Rules for classification: 1) Points; 2) Goal difference; 3) Goals scored; 4) Head-to-head points; 5) Away goals scored; 6) Draw.

=== Group 6 ===
Pos	Team	Pld	W	D	L	GF	GA	GD	Pts	B05	OB	VIK	EIS
1	(Czechoslovakia) Bohemians Prague	6	2	4	0	11	9	+2	8	—	2–1	2–2	3–2
2	(Denmark) Odense	6	3	1	2	11	10	+1	7	2–2	—	0–3	2–1
3	(Norway) Viking	6	1	3	2	9	10	−1	5	1–1	2–3	—	1–1
4	(Austria) Eisenstadt	6	1	2	3	8	10	−2	4	1–1	0–3	3–0	—

Source: mogiel.net
Rules for classification: 1) Points; 2) Goal difference; 3) Goals scored; 4) Head-to-head points; 5) Away goals scored; 6) Draw.

=== Group 7 ===
Pos	Team	Pld	W	D	L	GF	GA	GD	Pts	GÖT	ADM	BGD	B03
1	(Sweden) IFK Göteborg	6	3	2	1	7	3	+4	8	—	1–2	3–0	1–0
2	(Austria) Admira/Wacker Wien	6	3	0	3	10	10	0	6	1–2	—	3–2	3–0
3	(Poland) Bałtyk Gdynia	6	2	2	2	8	9	−1	6	0–0	3–1	—	2–1
4	(Denmark) B 1903	6	1	2	3	4	7	−3	4	0–0	2–0	1–1	—

Source: mogiel.net
Rules for classification: 1) Points; 2) Goal difference; 3) Goals scored; 4) Head-to-head points; 5) Away goals scored; 6) Draw.

=== Group 8 ===
Pos	Team	Pld	W	D	L	GF	GA	GD	Pts	HAM	BIE	BVR	BRY
1	(Sweden) Hammarby	6	6	0	0	19	3	+16	12	—	2–1	2–1	6–0
2	(West Germany) Arminia Bielefeld	6	4	0	2	10	5	+5	8	0–2	—	4–0	3–1
3	(Bulgaria) Botev Vratsa	6	2	0	4	6	9	−3	4	1–2	0–1	—	1–0
4	(Norway) Bryne	6	0	0	6	1	19	−18	0	0–5	0–1	0–3	—

Source: mogiel.net
Rules for classification: 1) Points; 2) Goal difference; 3) Goals scored; 4) Head-to-head points; 5) Away goals scored; 6) Draw.

=== Group 9 ===
Pos	Team	Pld	W	D	L	GF	GA	GD	Pts	VID	CHE	CRA	STU
1	(Hungary) Videoton	6	5	0	1	15	3	+12	10	—	1–0	6–0	3–0
2	(Czechoslovakia) Cheb	6	4	1	1	12	3	+9	9	2–1	—	2–0	5–0
3	(Poland) Cracovia	6	1	1	4	4	14	−10	3	1–3	0–2	—	1–1
4	(Austria) Sturm Graz	6	0	2	4	2	13	−11	2	0–1	1–1	0–2	—

Source: mogiel.net
Rules for classification: 1) Points; 2) Goal difference; 3) Goals scored; 4) Head-to-head points; 5) Away goals scored; 6) Draw.

=== Group 10 ===
Pos	Team	Pld	W	D	L	GF	GA	GD	Pts	VIT	EIN	PLO	ELF
1	(Czechoslovakia) Vítkovice	6	4	1	1	13	11	+2	9	—	2–2	4–2	2–1
2	(West Germany) Eintracht Braunschweig	6	3	1	2	9	5	+4	7	0–2	—	2–0	4–0
3	(Bulgaria) Trakia Plovdiv	6	2	1	3	11	8	+3	5	5–1	0–1	—	4–0
4	(Sweden) Elfsborg	6	1	1	4	3	12	−9	3	1–2	1–0	0–0	—

Source: mogiel.net
Rules for classification: 1) Points; 2) Goal difference; 3) Goals scored; 4) Head-to-head points; 5) Away goals scored; 6) Draw.

== See also ==
- 1983–84 European Cup
- 1983–84 UEFA Cup Winners' Cup
- 1983–84 UEFA Cup
