= 1977–78 Liga Leumit =

Liga Leumit
- Season: 1977–78
- Champions: Maccabi Netanya; 3rd title
- Relegated: Hakoah Ramat Gan; Hapoel Acre
- Top goalscorer: David Lavi (17)

The 1977–78 Liga Leumit season saw Maccabi Netanya win the title, while Hakoah Ramat Gan and Hapoel Acre were relegated to Liga Artzit. David Lavi of Maccabi Netanya was the league's top scorer with 17 goals.

The following season, the league was expanded to 16 clubs.

== Final table ==
| Pos | Team | Pld | W | D | L | GF | GA | GD | Pts | Qualification or relegation |
|---|---|---|---|---|---|---|---|---|---|---|
| 1 | Maccabi Netanya (C) | 26 | 15 | 8 | 3 | 50 | 21 | +29 | 38 | Qualification for the Intertoto Cup |
| 2 | Beitar Jerusalem | 26 | 12 | 9 | 5 | 32 | 14 | +18 | 33 | |
| 3 | Maccabi Tel Aviv | 26 | 12 | 8 | 6 | 44 | 29 | +15 | 32 | Qualification for the Intertoto Cup |
| 4 | Hapoel Yehud | 26 | 9 | 11 | 6 | 20 | 17 | +3 | 29 | |
| 5 | Hapoel Be'er Sheva | 26 | 9 | 8 | 9 | 43 | 32 | +11 | 26 | |
| 6 | Hapoel Jerusalem | 26 | 9 | 8 | 9 | 27 | 22 | +5 | 26 | |
| 7 | Shimshon Tel Aviv | 26 | 8 | 10 | 8 | 23 | 25 | −2 | 26 | |
| 8 | Beitar Tel Aviv | 26 | 7 | 12 | 7 | 23 | 26 | −3 | 26 | |
| 9 | Hapoel Tel Aviv | 26 | 8 | 10 | 8 | 26 | 30 | −4 | 26 | |
| 10 | Maccabi Jaffa | 26 | 6 | 12 | 8 | 31 | 38 | −7 | 24 | |
| 11 | Hapoel Hadera | 26 | 9 | 6 | 11 | 32 | 41 | −9 | 24 | |
| 12 | Hapoel Haifa | 26 | 8 | 7 | 11 | 19 | 29 | −10 | 23 | |
| 13 | Hakoah Ramat Gan (R) | 26 | 4 | 11 | 11 | 19 | 32 | −13 | 19 | Relegated to Liga Artzit |
| 14 | Hapoel Acre (R) | 26 | 2 | 8 | 16 | 15 | 48 | −33 | 12 | Relegated to Liga Artzit |

Source: rsssf.com
(C) Champions; (R) Relegated

== Results ==
| Home \ Away | BEI | BTA | HAR | HAC | HBS | HAH | HHA | HJE | HTA | HYE | MJA | MNE | MTA | STA |
|---|---|---|---|---|---|---|---|---|---|---|---|---|---|---|
| Beitar Jerusalem | — | 1–0 | 1–0 | 2–0 | 3–0 | 3–0 | 0–1 | 1–0 | 0–1 | 0–0 | 0–0 | 2–0 | 0–0 | 0–1 |
| Beitar Tel Aviv | 2–2 | — | 1–0 | 2–0 | 1–1 | 5–0 | 0–0 | 1–0 | 3–3 | 1–0 | 2–1 | 1–1 | 0–3 | 0–1 |
| Hakoah Ramat Gan | 0–4 | 1–1 | — | 0–0 | 2–1 | 1–3 | 2–0 | 1–1 | 0–1 | 0–0 | 2–2 | 1–2 | 1–0 | 0–1 |
| Hapoel Acre | 0–0 | 1–1 | 0–1 | — | 2–4 | 2–2 | 1–2 | 1–3 | 0–2 | 0–0 | 1–1 | 0–3 | 0–0 | 1–2 |
| Hapoel Be'er Sheva | 0–1 | 2–0 | 2–2 | 4–2 | — | 5–0 | 3–0 | 2–0 | 1–1 | 0–0 | 6–0 | 1–3 | 0–1 | 1–1 |
| Hapoel Hadera | 0–4 | 0–0 | 1–0 | 5–1 | 2–0 | — | 5–1 | 0–0 | 2–0 | 2–0 | 0–1 | 0–0 | 3–1 | 0–1 |
| Hapoel Haifa | 1–0 | 0–0 | 1–1 | 0–0 | 0–0 | 2–0 | — | 2–0 | 0–0 | 1–2 | 1–0 | 0–1 | 1–0 | 1–2 |
| Hapoel Jerusalem | 1–1 | 0–1 | 3–0 | 1–0 | 1–2 | 3–3 | 2–1 | — | 2–0 | 0–0 | 4–0 | 1–2 | 1–0 | 0–0 |
| Hapoel Tel Aviv | 2–2 | 0–0 | 1–1 | 1–0 | 2–1 | 1–0 | 1–2 | 0–0 | — | 1–1 | 1–2 | 1–0 | 0–0 | 1–2 |
| Hapoel Yehud | 0–0 | 2–0 | 1–0 | 0–1 | 4–1 | 1–0 | 1–0 | 0–2 | 2–0 | — | 0–0 | 0–2 | 2–1 | 1–0 |
| Maccabi Jaffa | 2–0 | 1–1 | 1–1 | 4–0 | 0–0 | 1–1 | 2–0 | 1–0 | 2–2 | 1–1 | — | 2–3 | 1–1 | 0–2 |
| Maccabi Netanya | 0–0 | 5–0 | 2–2 | 3–0 | 1–1 | 5–1 | 3–0 | 0–1 | 3–0 | 3–1 | 2–1 | — | 3–3 | 1–1 |
| Maccabi Tel Aviv | 2–3 | 1–0 | 2–0 | 5–0 | 3–2 | 3–1 | 2–1 | 3–1 | 3–2 | 0–0 | 5–3 | 1–1 | — | 3–2 |
| Shimshon Tel Aviv | 1–2 | 0–0 | 0–0 | 0–2 | 0–3 | 0–1 | 1–1 | 0–0 | 1–2 | 1–1 | 2–2 | 0–1 | 1–1 | — |

Legend: Blue = home team win; Yellow = draw; Red = away team win.
