= List of Bnei Yehuda Tel Aviv F.C. seasons =

This is a list of seasons played by Bnei Yehuda Football Club in Israeli and European football, from 1940 (when the club joined the Israeli football league system) to the most recent completed season. It details the club's achievements in major competitions and the top scorers for each season. Top scorers in bold were also the top scorers in the Israeli league that season. Records of minor cup competitions, such as the Lilian Cup and the Israel Super Cup are not included due to them being considered of less importance than the State Cup and the Toto Cup.

The club has won the League Championship once, the State Cup twice and the Toto Cup twice, as well as winning the second division six times.

== History ==
Bnei Yehuda Tel Aviv was formed in January 1936 in the Hatikva Quarter of Tel Aviv. The club was promoted to the top division for the first time in 1959, and as of 2016 played 50 seasons in the top division.

== Seasons ==
Season	League									State Cup	Toto Cup	Europe	Top goalscorer		Coach
Season	Division	P	W	D	L	F	A	Pts	Pos	State Cup	Toto Cup	Europe	Name	Goals	Coach
1939–40	Gimel	–	–	–	–	–	–	–	– (Note: No information is available regarding placings in 1940 Liga gimel.)	dnp	–	–			
1940–41	– (Note: No league was played due to disagreements between Maccabi and Hapoel factions in the IFA.)	–	–	–	–	–	–	–	–	dnp	–	–			
1941–42	Bet South	12	8	1	3	25	12	17	2nd	R1	–	–			
1942–43	– (Note: The 1941–42 top division was played during the season with no new Liga Bet season organized.)	–	–	–	–	–	–	–	–	dnp	–	–			
1943–44	Bet									dnp	–	–			
1944–45	Bet									dnp	–	–			
1945–46	– (Note: No league was played due to disagreements between Maccabi and Hapoel factions in the IFA.)	–	–	–	–	–	–	–	–	R1	–	–			
1946–47	Bet south	–	–	–	–	–	–	–	– (Note: Bnei Yehuda withdrew from the league.)	dnp	–	–			
1947–48	Bet South	–	–	–	–	–	–	–	– (Note: The league was abandoned due to the 1947–1949 Palestine war.)	–	–	–			
1948–49	– (Note: No league was played due to the 1947–1949 Palestine war.)	–	–	–	–	–	–	–	–	dnp	–	–			
1949–50	Meuhedet Tel Aviv	16	14	0	2	48	6	28	**1st**	–	–	–			
1950–51	– (Note: No league was played due to disagreements between Maccabi and Hapoel factions in the IFA.)	–	–	–	–	–	–	–	–	–	–	–			
1951–52	Bet South	26	11	6	9	40	34	28	7th	R3	–	–			
1952–53	– (Note: No league was played due to disagreements between Maccabi and Hapoel factions in the IFA.)	–	–	–	–	–	–	–	–	–	–	–			
1953–54	Bet South	26	7	5	14	33	58	19	12th	R3	–	–			
1954–55	Bet South	22	9	3	10	36	44	20	8th	R4	–	–	Avraham Almog	9	
1955–56	Bet South	22	8	7	7	33	26	23	6th	–	–	–	Yosef Mehalel	9	David Sulami
1956–57	Bet South	24	21	1	2	92	20	43	2nd	R3	–	–	Marco Abud	25	David Sulami
1957–58	Alef	20	12	3	5	39	26	27	2nd (Note: The league was abandoned after the 20th round (out of 22).)	R6	–	–	Shalom Sinwani	10	David Sulami
1958–59	Alef	22	14	6	2	49	15	34	**1st**	R5	–	–	Shalom Sinwani	13	David Sulami
1959–60	Leumit	22	9	1	12	34	51	19	7th	R8	–	–	Zaki Mizrahi; Mal'akh Rotshes	8	David Sulami
1960–61	Leumit	22	3	5	13	20	38	13	11th	R5	–	–	Mal'akh Rotshes	5	David Sulami
1961–62	Leumit	22	9	6	7	32	26	24	R5	–	–	–	Zaki Mizrahi	11	Emmanuel Scheffer
1962–63	Leumit	22	9	4	9	30	33	22	5th	R6	–	–	Zaki Mizrahi	11	Yosef Merimovich
1963–64	Leumit	28	8	7	13	36	46	23	12	R5	–	–	Emmanuel Tasa	11	Arie Koch; Emmanuel Scheffer
1964–65	Leumit	30	9	10	11	48	48	28	11	**Runners-up**	–	–	Zaki Mizrahi	19	Israel Halivner; Ya'akov Grundman
1965–66	Leumit	30	9	11	10	31	38	28	10th	R6	–	–	Emmanuel Tasa; Zaki Mizrahi	8	Itzhak Glacksman
1966–67	Leumit	60	20	24	16	54	49	64	7th	SF	–	–	Zaki Mizrahi	13	Ya'akov Grundman
1967–68	Leumit	60	20	24	16	54	49	64	7th	**Winners**	–	–	Zaki Mizrahi	13	Ya'akov Grundman; Zaki Mizrahi
1968–69	Leumit	30	11	5	14	36	38	27	8th	R7	–	–	Zaki Mizrahi	10	Arie Redler
1969–70	Leumit	30	6	15	9	24	28	27	14th	R6	–	–	Avishai Sulami	7	Nahum Stelmach
1970–71	Leumit	30	7	12	11	19	29	26	13th	QF	–	–	Shalom Shikva	6	Ya'akov Grundman
1971–72	Leumit	30	5	9	16	17	41	19	15th	R6	–	–	Ehud Ben Tuvim	7	Dov Malis; Zaki Mizrahi
1972–73	Alef South	30	21	7	2	59	23	49	**1st**	R4	–	–	Ehud Ben Tuvim	27	Yechiel Mor
1973–74	Leumit	30	6	16	8	21	24	28	10th	R4	–	–	Ehud Ben Tuvim; Ya'akov Sharabi	6	Yosef Mehalel
1974–75	Leumit	30	9	10	11	27	29	28	11th	R4	–	–	Alon Tzuberi	7	Yosef Mehalel
1975–76	Leumit	34	6	12	16	26	48	24	17th	R4	–	–	Ehud Ben Tuvim; Moshe Cohen	7	Eli Fuchs
1976–77	Artzit	22	11	9	2	39	16	31	2nd	R6	–	–	Ehud Ben Tuvim	17	Zvi Singel
1977–78	Artzit	26	20	3	3	61	20	43	**1st**	**Runners-up**	–	–	Ehud Ben Tuvim	22	Ze'ev Seltzer
1978–79	Leumit	30	8	17	5	28	21	33	4th	SF	–	–	Ehud Ben Tuvim	11	Ze'ev Seltzer
1979–80	Leumit	30	10	11	9	33	28	31	6th	R7	–	–	Ehud Ben Tuvim	10	Yechiel Mor; Shimon Ben Yehonatan
1980–81	Leumit	30	11	13	6	38	27	35	2nd	**Winners**	–	–	Ehud Ben Tuvim	14	Shlomo Scharf
1981–82	Leumit	30	13	9	8	34	30	35	3rd	R8	–	–	Moshe Yechiel	11	Shlomo Scharf
1982–83	Leumit	30	7	15	8	26	35	36	12th	R8	–	–	Ehud Ben Tuvim	10	Shlomo Scharf
1983–84	Leumit	30	8	10	12	27	36	34	14th	R8	–	–	Moshe Onana	9	Ya'akov Grundman
1984–85	Artzit	30	18	6	6	48	23	60	**1st**	R8	**Runners-up**	–	Ehud Ben Tuvim; David Salman; Yigal Keren	9	Leon Konstantinovski
1985–86	Leumit	30	12	10	8	27	19	46	5th	R8	Group	–	Moshe Eisenberg	5	Itzhak Schneor
1986–87	Leumit	30	11	18	1	37	25	51	2nd	R9	Group	–	David Gordana	8	Itzhak Schneor
1987–88	Leumit	30	11	11	9	28	23	44	10th	R9	**Runners-up**	–	David Gordana	6	David Schweitzer
1988–89	Leumit	33	8	14	11	31	29	38	11th	R9	Group	–	David Gordana	8	Ehud Ben Tuvim; Giora Spiegel
1989–90	Leumit	32	17	11	4	48	24	62	**1st**	QF	**Runners-up**	–	Moshe Sinai	14	Giora Spiegel
1990–91	Leumit	32	10	11	11	41	40	41	8th	QF	Group	–	Yossi Alpia; Rave Sharabi; Gerardo González	6	Giora Spiegel
1991–92	Leumit	32	19	5	8	68	44	62	2nd	R9	**Winners**	–	Alon Mizrahi	20	Giora Spiegel
1992–93	Leumit	33	17	5	11	66	57	56	3rd	QF	Group	–	Alon Mizrahi	26	Amatzia Levkovic
1993–94	Leumit	39	13	8	18	55	67	47	9th	QF	Group	–	Mykola Kudrytsky	20	Rami Levy
1994–95	Leumit	30	8	10	12	43	39	34	10th	QF	Group	–	Syarhey Herasimets	13	Nissim Bachar; Janos Pas
1995–96	Leumit	30	7	7	16	46	65	28	11th	SF	Group	–	Alon Mizrahi	13	Ya'akov Grundman
1996–97	Leumit	30	10	8	12	32	40	38	10th	SF	**Winners**	–	Alon Mizrahi	18	Boaz Sulami
1997–98	Leumit	30	8	7	15	26	42	31	14th	R9	Group	–	Kobi Refua	7	Vico Haddad; Ya'akov Grundman
1998–99	Leumit	30	10	6	14	43	51	36	11th	SF	Group	–	Kobi Refua	17	Rami Levy
1999–2000	Premier	39	9	13	17	53	71	40	11th	8th	R2	–	Kobi Refua	17	Giora Spiegel; Yehoshua Feigenbaum
2000–01	Premier	38	8	9	21	38	64	33	11th	R9	SF	–	Ofer Shitrit; Dudi Liberman	6	Eli Ohana
2001–02	Leumit	33	16	13	4	58	30	61	2nd	QF	R1	–	Vladimir Andonov	16	Rami Levy; Eli Ohana
2002–03	Premier	33	9	7	17	39	63	34	10th	QF	Group	–	Vladimir Andonov	12	Eli Ohana
2003–04	Premier	33	12	9	12	34	42	45	6th	R9	Group	–	Mate Baturina	11	Nitzan Shirazi
2004–05	Premier	33	12	8	13	40	46	44	6th	QF	SF	–	Moshe Biton	10	Nitzan Shirazi
2005–06	Premier	33	14	7	12	37	41	49	4th	**Runners-up**	Group	–	Eli Biton	8	Nitzan Shirazi
2006–07	Premier	33	7	14	12	34	50	35	9th	R9	Group	Uefa Cup QR2	Lior Asulin	13	Nitzan Shirazi
2007–08	Premier	33	11	5	17	31	43	38	9th	QF	SF	–	Moshe Biton	12	Nitzan Shirazi; Eli Cohen; Asayag/H. Shirazi
2008–09	Premier	33	14	7	12	38	31	49	5th	R9	QF	–	Eliran Atar	14	Guy Luzon
2009–10	Premier	35	14	11	10	43	34	31 (Note: Bnei Yehuda achieved 45 points in regular seasons, which were halved at the beginning of the play-offs. The club scored 8 more points during the play-offs for a total of 53 points.)	4th	**Runners-up**	R2	EL QPO	Pedro Galván	12	Guy Luzon
2010–11	Premier	35	15	10	10	42	34	31 (Note: Bnei Yehuda achieved 48 points in regular seasons, which were halved at the beginning of the play-offs. The club scored 7 more points during the play-offs for a total of 55 points.)	4th	R8	SF	EL QR2	Pedro Galván	16	Dror Kashtan
2011–12	Premier	37	16	11	10	53	36	59	3rd	R8	Group	EL QR3	Pedro Galván	16	Yossi Abuksis
2012–13	Premier	36	16	7	13	50	40	55	4th	R8	Group	EL QR3	Pedro Galván	11	Dror Kashtan
2013–14	Premier	33	7	10	16	32	45	31	14th	R8	–	–	Amir Agayov	8	Dror Kashtan; Ya'akov Asayag; Yossi Abuksis
2014–15	Liga Leumit	37	21	13	3	69	26	76	**1st**	R8	**Runners-up**	–	Pedro Galván	22	Yossi Abuksis
2015–16	Premier	33	13	7	13	37	43	46	8th	QF	SF	–			Yossi Abuksis; Yossi Mizrahi

== Key ==
- P = Played
- W = Games won
- D = Games drawn
- L = Games lost
- F = Goals for
- A = Goals against
- Pts = Points
- Pos = Final position
- Leumit = Liga Leumit (National League)
- Alef = Liga Alef (A League)
- Artzit = Liga Artzit (Nationwide League)
- Al = Liga Al (Premier League)
- Bet = Liga Bet (B League)
- Gimel = Liga Gimel (C League)
- F = Final
- Group = Group stage
- QF = Quarter-finals
- QR1 = First Qualifying Round
- QR2 = Second Qualifying Round
- QR3 = Third Qualifying Round
- QR4 = Fourth Qualifying Round
- QPO = Play-off round
- RInt = Intermediate Round
- R1 = Round 1
- R2 = Round 2
- R3 = Round 3
- R4 = Round 4
- R5 = Round 5
- R6 = Round 6
- R7 = Round 7
- R8 = Round 8
- R9 = Round 9
- SF = Semi-finals
- dnp =Did not participated

Champions	Runners-up	Promoted	Relegated
