= 1982 Israel Super Cup =

Hapoel Kfar Saba	Hapoel Yehud
3	3
- Hapoel Kfar Saba won 3–2 on penalties
- Date: 29 May 1982
- Venue: Municipal Stadium, Yehud
- Referee: Naftali Eitan

The 1982 Israel Super Cup was the 12th Israel Super Cup (17th, including unofficial matches, as the competition wasn't played within the Israel Football Association in its first 5 editions, until 1969), an annual Israel football match played between the winners of the previous season's Top Division and Israel State Cup.

The match was played between Hapoel Kfar Saba, champions of the 1981–82 Liga Leumit and Hapoel Yehud, winners of the 1981–82 Israel State Cup.

This was Kfar Saba's 3rd Israel Super Cup appearance and Hapoel Yehud's first. At the match, played at Yehud, Hapoel Kfar Saba won 3–2 on penalties.

== Match details ==
29 May 1982

Hapoel Kfar Saba	3–3 (a.e.t.)	Hapoel Yehud
Fogel 16', 20'; Almog 113'		Vizan 28'; Ajobel 78'; Balachsan 107'
Penalties
	3–2

Municipal Stadium, Yehud
Referee: Naftali EItan

Hapoel Kfar Saba	Hapoel Yehud

GK	(Israel) Ofer Nosovski
RB	(Israel) Rafi Idinger
CB	Israel Hajaj	Substituted off
CB	(Israel) Ariel Ben Arie	Substituted off
LB	(Israel) Noah Einstein
CM	(Israel) Dori Almog
CM	(Israel) Gideon Simon
CM	(Israel) Eitan Revivo
FW	Israel Fogel (c)
FW	(Israel) Shlomo Weitzmann
FW	(Israel) Itzhak Maimoni
Substitutes:
DF	(Israel) Ze'ev Kaplan	Substituted in
MF	(Israel) Eli Sa'id	Substituted in
Manager:
(Israel) Dror Kashtan

GK	(Israel) Arie Haviv
RB	(Israel) Moshe Shabat
DF	(Israel) Aharon Vizan
DF	(Israel) Herzl Shaul
LB	(Israel) Shaul Sasson
CM	Israel Sasson (c)
CM	(Israel) Avi Cohen	Substituted off
CM	(Israel) Pinhas Drori
FW	(Israel) Yehuda Dugach	Substituted off
FW	(Israel) Shalom Rokvan
FW	(Israel) Itzhak Balachsan
Substitutes:
MF	(Israel) Ya'akov Ajobel	Substituted in
FW	(Israel) Amir Liberman	Substituted in
Manager:
(Israel) Zvi Rosen
