= 1990 Israel Super Cup =

| Bnei Yehuda | Hapoel Kfar Saba |
| 1 | 0 |
- Date: 11 September 1990
- Venue: Hatikva Neighborhood Stadium, Tel Aviv
- Referee: Yehoshua Loya
- Attendance: 600

The 1990 Israel Super Cup was the 19th Israel Super Cup (24th, including unofficial matches, as the competition wasn't played within the Israel Football Association in its first 5 editions, until 1969), an annual Israel football match played between the winners of the previous season's Top Division and Israel State Cup.

The match was played between Bnei Yehuda, champions of the 1989–90 Liga Leumit and Hapoel Kfar Saba, winners of the 1989–90 Israel State Cup.

This was Bnei Yehuda's 3rd Israel Super Cup appearance (including unofficial matches) and Kfar Saba's 4th. Watched by a crowd of 600 at Hatikva Neighborhood Stadium, Bnei Yehuda won the match 1–0.

== Match details ==
9 September 1990

| Bnei Yehuda | 1–0 | Hapoel Kfar Saba |
|---|---|---|
| Menachem 31' |

HaTikva Neighborhood Stadium, Tel Aviv
Attendance: 600
Referee: Yehoshua Loya
