= 1957 Israel Super Cup =

Hapoel Tel Aviv	Hapoel Petah Tikva
3	0
- Date: 23 November 1957
- Venue: Basa Stadium, Tel Aviv
- Referee: Werner
- Attendance: 6,000

The 1957 Israel Super Cup was the first edition of the Israel Super Cup, an annual Israeli football match played between the winners of the previous season's Top Division and Israel State Cup. As the match was not set by the Israel Football Association, it was considered an unofficial cup, with the cup being donated by the family of Lt-Col Zivi Tzafriri, who died in battle during the Sinai War

In the match, held on 23 November 1957, league champions Hapoel Tel Aviv had beaten Hapoel Petah Tikva 3–0.

== Match details ==
23 November 1957

Hapoel Tel Aviv	3–0	Hapoel Petah Tikva
S. Dukas 12', 78'; Tish 39'

Basa Stadium, Tel Aviv
Attendance: 6,000
Referee: Werner
