= Rami Levy =

Rami Levy may refer to:

- Rami Levy (businessman), Israeli owner of the Rami Levy Hashikma Marketing supermarket chain
  - Rami Levy Hashikma Marketing, a chain of supermarkets in Israel
    - Rami Levy Communications, a mobile virtual network operator
- Rami Levy (footballer), Israeli football manager and a former player

== See also ==
- Ram Loevy
