= Zivi Tzafriri =

Israeli Armor Corps officer

- זיוי צפרירי
- Born: 8 July 1927; Ein Harod, British Mandate of Palestine
- Died: 1 November 1956 (aged 29)
- Occupation: Officer
- Military career
- Allegiance: Israel Defense Forces, Palmach
- Service years: 1945–1956
- Rank: Sgan Aluf (Lt-Col)
- Conflicts: 1948 Arab–Israeli War; Sinai War

Zivi Tzafriri (Hebrew: זיוי צפרירי; 8 July 1927 – 1 November 1956), was an Israeli Armor Corps officer who was killed during the Sinai War.

== Early years ==
Zivi Tzafriri was born in Ein Harod in British Mandate of Palestine to Ya'akov and Batia Tzafriri. The family moved to kibbutz Givat HaShlosha while Tzafriri was a child. He attended Ohel Shem high school in Ramat Gan, and late the Regional agricultural high school in Givat HaShlosha.

== Military years and death ==
In 1945 Tzafriri joined the Palmach, and joined the IDF upon its establishment. He fought in the 1948 Arab–Israeli War in the central and Jerusalem fronts, and was wounded during the battle over Ramat Rachel, and once again during the Battle of Latrun. During the war Tzafriri was transferred to the Armor Corps. After the war Tzafriri retired from the army and returned to Givat HaShlosha. In 1950 Tzafriri was re-enlisted to the army as an officer in the Armor Corps.

In 1956, during the Sinai War, Tzafriri took part in the battle over Rafah. He was wounded during the battle, but carried on fighting. His Armoured personnel carrier was shelled and Tzafriri, along with his 9-man crew, was instantly killed.

== Family ==
In 1953, he married his wife, Odeda, and settled in Einat.

== Remembrance ==
Beit Zivi in Einat, Zivi Hall (Ulam Zivi) in Ohel Shem school are named after Tzafriri. After his death, his father issued two yearly scholarships to Mikveh Israel school, to Ohel Shem students and erected a fund for Hebrew University of Jerusalem students.

In football, Tzafriri was memorialized through several cups given in his honor, including the first ever Israel Super Cup, played between Hapoel Tel Aviv and Hapoel Petah Tikva in 1957. The sports compound in Kiryat Shalom, home of Hapoel Kiryat Shalom, is also called after him.
