= Shmulik Perlman =

Israeli footballer and manager

Shmulik Perlman שמוליק פרלמן
Personal information
- Full name: Shmuel Perlman
- Date of birth: 23 May 1926
- Place of birth: Tel Aviv, Israel
- Date of death: 24 September 2003 (age 77)

Youth career
- 1936–1940: Maccabi Ramat Gan
- 1940–1942: Maccabi Netanya

Senior career*
Years	Team	Apps	(Gls)
1942–1958	Maccabi Netanya		

Managerial career
- 1959–1960: Hapoel Even Yehuda
- 1961–1968: Maccabi Netanya (youth)
- 1968–1969: Israel U18
- 1969–1970: Hapoel Hadera
- 1970–1971: Maccabi Herzliya
- 1971–1975: Maccabi Netanya (youth)
- 1975–1979: Maccabi Netanya
- 1979: Hapoel Haifa
- 1980–1981: Maccabi Jaffa
- 1981–1982: Maccabi Netanya
- 1983–1984: Israel U19
- 1984–1985: Hakoah Ramat Gan
- 1985–1986: Beitar Netanya
- 1986–1987: Maccabi Herzliya
- 1987–1988: Beitar Netanya
- 1988–1989: Hapoel Yehud
- 1992–1994: Maccabi Netanya
- 1995: Maccabi Netanya
- * Club domestic league appearances and goals

Shmulik Perlman (Hebrew: שמוליק פרלמן; 23 May 1926 – 24 September 2003) was an Israeli football player and manager.

== Career ==
Perlman was born in Tel Aviv in 1926, he began his career in the youth ranks of Maccabi Ramat Gan. At the age of 14 he moved to Maccabi Netanya, Netanya paid Ramat Gan a transfer fee of £P30. He began playing for the senior side at the age of 16 and on 25 March 1944 scored his first goal in the first division, in a 2–0 victory over Maccabi Petah Tikva. Perlman played with Netanya in the State cup finals of 1954 against Maccabi Tel Aviv. His last game was on 18 January 1958, in a game where his team lost to Maccabi Tel Aviv 3–1 in the league.

After retiring as a player, Perlman started his coaching career. After one season with Hapoel Even Yehuda he was appointed the youth coach of Maccabi Netanya. He remained with Netanya until 1968. In 1968, he coached the national youth team for one year and later on worked as the coach of Hapoel Hadera and Maccabi Herzliya. In 1971, he came back to work as the youth coach of Maccabi Netanya and four years later he became the coach of the senior side. In the 1977–78 season Perlman led the club to its finest hour as the club won all the titles in Israeli football as well as their group in the UEFA Intertoto Cup.

After his first term in Netanya, Perlman worked in such clubs as Hapoel Haifa and Maccabi Jaffa. He returned to coach Maccabi Netanya in the 1981–82 season, the season was highly successful yet Netanya finished only as the league runners-up, as they lost the title to Hapoel Kfar Saba by one point.

From 1983 to 1985 Perlman worked as the coach of the Israel national under-19 football team. After two years with the national under-19 he bounced around with a few clubs from the Liga Leumit and Liga Artzit. During the 1992–93 he was appointed coach of Maccabi Netanya again, and the following season led the team to sixth place in the table. Perlman did not go on for another season, but six games to the end of the 1994–95 season he returned. He wasn't able to keep the club in the league, and Netanya dropped to the second division. After this season Perlman did not return to coach again.

== Managerial statistics with Maccabi Netanya ==
Team	From	To	Record				
Team	From	To	P	W	D	L	Win %
Maccabi Netanya	1975	1979	150	68	49	33	45.33
Maccabi Netanya	1981	1982	39	20	10	9	51.28
Maccabi Netanya	1992	1994	84	28	18	38	33.33
Maccabi Netanya	1995	1995	6	1	3	2	16.67
Total			279	117	80	82	41.94

== Honours ==
=== As a player ===
- State Cup runner-up: 1954

=== As a manager ===
- Championships: 1977–78; runner-up 1981–82
- State Cup: 1978
- Israeli Supercup: 1978
- UEFA Intertoto Cup: 1978
