= Arie Haviv =

Israeli footballer

Personal information
- Full name: Arie Haviv
- Date of birth: June 9, 1956 (age 70)
- Place of birth: Yehud, Israel
- Position: Goalkeeper

Senior career*
Years	Team	Apps	(Gls)
1977–1984	Hapoel Yehud		
1984–1985	Hapoel Kfar Saba		
1985–1986	Maccabi Netanya		
1987–1988	Hapoel Haifa		
1988–1990	Beitar Tel Aviv		

International career
1978–1985	Israel	25	(0)
- * Club domestic league appearances and goals

Arie Haviv (Hebrew: אריה חביב) is a former Israeli footballer of Tunisian Jewish descent.
