= Nati Azaria =

Israeli footballer and manager

Nati Azaria נתי עזריה
Personal information
- Full name: Nati Azaria
- Date of birth: May 31, 1967 (age 59)
- Place of birth: Netanya, Israel
- Height: 6 ft 0 in (1.83 m)
- Position: Striker

Team information
- Current team: Beitar Tubruk

Youth career
- Maccabi Netanya

Senior career*
Years	Team	Apps	(Gls)
1985–1998	Maccabi Netanya	128	(28)
1991–1993	→ Maccabi Sha'arayim (loan)		
1994–1995	→ Hapoel Kfar Saba (loan)		
1995–1996	→ Hapoel Tayibe (loan)		
1998–1999	Hapoel Iksal		
1999–2000	Maccabi Sha'arayim	?	(11)

Managerial career
- 2005–2008: Maccabi Netanya (U-15)
- 2008–2009: Maccabi Netanya (assistant manager)
- 2009: Maccabi Netanya
- 2010–2012: Maccabi Netanya (U-15)
- 2012–2013: Maccabi Netanya (youth)
- 2013–2017: Hapoel Kfar Saba (youth)
- 2017–: Beitar Tubruk
- * Club domestic league appearances and goals

Nati Azaria (Hebrew: נתי עזריה; born May 31, 1967) is a former Israeli footballer and now manager.

Azaria was a striker who scored over 100 goals in a career that lasted 15 years.

== Statistics ==
Team	Nat	From	To	Record				
Team	Nat	From	To	G	W	D	L	Win %
Maccabi Netanya	(Israel)	June 1, 2009	September 29, 2009	13	2	4	7	15
