= Avraham Bendori =

Israeli footballer (1928–2019)

Avraham Bendori אברהם בנדורי
Personal information
- Full name: Avraham Bendori
- Date of birth: June 21, 1928
- Place of birth: Tel Aviv, Mandatory Palestine
- Date of death: January 15, 2019 (aged 90)
- Position: Goalkeeper

Youth career
- 1942–1946: Maccabi Tel Aviv

Senior career*
Years	Team	Apps	(Gls)
1946–1960	Maccabi Tel Aviv		

International career
1949–1959	Israel	4	(0)

Managerial career
- 1963–1964: Hapoel Kiryat Haim
- 1968: Maccabi Petah Tikva
- 1969–1970: Hapoel Rishon LeZion
- 1970–1971: Hapoel Ramat Gan
- * Club domestic league appearances and goals

Avraham Bendori (Hebrew: אברהם בנדורי; June 21, 1928 – January 15, 2019) was an Israeli footballer who played for Maccabi Tel Aviv and the Israel national team. He later worked as a manager.

== Career ==
Bendori was born in Tel Aviv in 1928 and joined Maccabi Tel Aviv at the age of 13. He was part of the Maccabi Michael youth team, which won back to back youth championship in the mid-1940s. In 1946 he was promoted to the senior team and played with the team until the end of the 1959–60 season, winning 6 league titles and 6 cups with the club.

Bendori was also a member of the Israel national football team, but only made a handful of appearances, as the main goalkeeper of the national team during this time was Ya'akov Hodorov. Bendori played in Israel's first match ever, against the U.S., but didn't make another appearance in an official match until 1958, when he started in two group phase matches of the 1958 Asian Games, as Hodorov was injured. His final match for Israel was played against Poland in Wrocław, in which Bendori conceded 5 goals and was substituted in the 64th minute. Israel lost 2–7 in the match, which became known as the "Wrocław Shame".

After retiring, Bendori coached several teams without much success and served as the national team's director.

== Personal life ==
Bendori, who was 20 during the 1948 Arab–Israeli War, fought in the Samson's Foxes unit, and was injured on the Egyptian front, near Iraq Suwaydan, when the jeep he was driving was bombarded. Bendori was hospitalized for several weeks and was released to take part in the national teams' tour of the U.S. During his time with Maccabi Tel Aviv, Bendori worked for Dan Bus Company.

== Honours ==
Maccabi Tel Aviv

- Palestine League: 1946–47
- Palestine Cup (2): 1946, 1947
- Israeli League (5): 1949–50, 1951–52, 1953–54, 1955–56, 1957–58
- Israel State Cup (4): 1953–54, 1954–55, 1957–58, 1958–59
