= 1943–44 in Mandatory Palestine football =

Football in Mandatory Palestine
- Season: 1943–44

The 1943–44 season was the 17th season of competitive football in the British Mandate for Palestine under the Eretz Israel Football Association.

== IFA Competitions ==
=== 1941–42 Palestine League ===
League matches, which started during the previous season were completed during the season with a single match played in the southern division and the final round play-offs. Maccabi Rishon LeZion won the southern division and qualified to the playoffs, along with second placed Maccabi Tel Aviv and Jerusalem division winner, Homenetmen Jerusalem. In the play-offs, Maccabi Tel Aviv won both its matches against Maccabi Rishon LeZion, while Homenetmen withdrew after playing one match, forfeiting the rest of its fixtures, and Maccabi Tel Aviv was declared league champions.

==== Southern League ====
| Pos | Team | Pld | W | D | L | GF | GA | GR | Pts | Qualification or relegation |
|---|---|---|---|---|---|---|---|---|---|---|
| 1 | Maccabi Rishon LeZion | 26 | 20 | 3 | 3 | 87 | 22 | 3.955 | 43 | Championship Playoffs |
| 2 | Maccabi Tel Aviv | 26 | 21 | 1 | 4 | 82 | 26 | 3.154 | 43 | Championship Playoffs |
| 3 | Maccabi Nes Tziona | 26 | 19 | 3 | 4 | 69 | 31 | 2.226 | 41 | |
| 4 | Hapoel Tel Aviv | 26 | 19 | 2 | 5 | 87 | 23 | 3.783 | 40 | |
| 5 | Maccabi Petah Tikva | 26 | 15 | 2 | 9 | 54 | 38 | 1.421 | 32 | |
| 6 | Hapoel Petah Tikva | 26 | 13 | 5 | 8 | 55 | 49 | 1.122 | 31 | |
| 7 | Beitar Tel Aviv | 26 | 11 | 4 | 11 | 50 | 48 | 1.042 | 25 (Note: Hapoel Rishon LeZion's matches against Beitar Tel Aviv and Degel Zion Tel Aviv were both given as 0–0 without points due to infringements from both involved clubs (in each match).) | |
| 8 | National Sport Club Jaffa | 26 | 11 | 3 | 12 | 55 | 55 | 1.000 | 25 | |
| 9 | Hapoel Ramat Gan | 26 | 9 | 4 | 13 | 54 | 67 | 0.806 | 22 | |
| 10 | Maccabi Rehovot | 26 | 8 | 5 | 13 | 34 | 50 | 0.680 | 21 | |
| 11 | Hapoel Herzliya | 26 | 4 | 3 | 19 | 27 | 66 | 0.409 | 11 | |
| 12 | Hapoel Rishon LeZion | 26 | 5 | 2 | 19 | 26 | 71 | 0.366 | 10 | |
| 13 | Hakoah Tel Aviv | 26 | 4 | 1 | 21 | 27 | 95 | 0.284 | 9 | |
| 14 | Degel Zion Tel Aviv | 26 | 1 | 6 | 19 | 11 | 77 | 0.143 | 7 | |

Updated to match(es) played on 4 September 1943. Source: Memo no. 11, p. 3 IFA (in Hebrew)
Rules for classification: 1) points; 2) goal ratio.

==== Championship play-off ====
| Pos | Team | Pld | W | D | L | GF | GA | GR | Pts | Qualification or relegation | MTA | MRL | HOM |
|---|---|---|---|---|---|---|---|---|---|---|---|---|---|
| 1 | Maccabi Tel Aviv | 4 | 4 | 0 | 0 | 13 | 0 | — | 8 | Champions | — | 5–0 | 3–0 |
| 2 | Maccabi Rishon LeZion | 4 | 1 | 1 | 2 | 6 | 10 | 0.600 | 3 | | 0–2 | — | 3–0 |
| 3 | Homenetmen Jerusalem | 4 | 0 | 1 | 3 | 3 | 12 | 0.250 | 1 | | 0–3 | 3–3 | — |

Updated to match(es) played on 30 October 1943. Source: League and Cup Committee Meeting 1.11.43 Israeli Football Association (in Hebrew)
Rules for classification: 1) points; 2) goal ratio.

=== 1943–44 Palestine League ===
League matches began on 11 September 1943 However, the league matches were not completed by the end of the season, and were continued after the summer break.

==== League table (top 5) ====
| Pos | Team | Pld | W | D | L | GF | GA | GR | Pts |
|---|---|---|---|---|---|---|---|---|---|
| 1 | Hapoel Tel Aviv | 19 | 16 | 3 | 0 | 73 | 10 | 7.300 | 35 |
| 2 | Maccabi Rehovot | 21 | 14 | 5 | 2 | 49 | 18 | 2.722 | 33 |
| 3 | Maccabi Tel Aviv | 21 | 13 | 2 | 6 | 63 | 27 | 2.333 | 28 |
| 4 | Maccabi Nes Tziona | 20 | 12 | 3 | 5 | 55 | 31 | 1.774 | 27 |
| 5 | Maccabi Netanya | 18 | 9 | 5 | 4 | 40 | 36 | 1.111 | 23 |

Source: The Palestine Post, 29 June 1944, p. 2

=== 1943 Palestine Cup ===
A cup competition was held during the previous season, in spring 1943, which was called The Wartime Cup, with the semi-finals and final being delayed over the summer break. The final, between Hapoel Jerusalem and a Royal Artillery XI was played on 16 October 1943, with the Gunners winning 7–1.

16 October 1943

| Gunners | 7–1 | Hapoel Jerusalem |
|---|---|---|
| | Summary |

Hapoel Petah Tikva ground

=== 1944 Palestine Cup ===
The competition started on 19 February 1944, but was delayed over the summer break and were completed during the following season.

== Notable events ==
- Between 28 August and 6 September, Al Ahly Cairo visited Mandatory Palestine. The team was billed as Cairo All Stars as the visit was against the Egyptian FA decision. The visiting team played five matches, three against the Jewish team: Beitar Tel Aviv, losing the first match 1–3, winning the second 2–0 and winning the third 4–1, and two against selected Arab XI teams from Jerusalem, winning 4–2, and Haifa, winning 4–0.
  Prior to Al Ahly's first match against Beitar Tel Aviv, the Egyptian FA notified the EIFA that Al Ahly's visit was against EFA decisions and asked to forbid any matches against Al Ahly. The EIFA notified Beitar Tel Aviv, which decided to go on with the planned match on 28 August 1943 and with the entire tour.
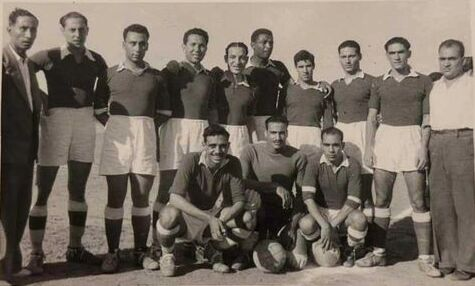
  Al Ahly Cairo team in Tel Aviv, Mandatory Palestine
  Beitar Tel Aviv was suspended from all activities, forcing the team to forfeit its cup semi-final match against Hapoel Jerusalem, and in October 1943 was given a six months suspension, a 12 months ban on matches against foreign teams and a 50 PP fine.
- On 15 April 1944, Hapoel Haifa won the Haifa Cup for the third consecutive year, after beating British army team All White 3–2 and 6–2 in the two legged final.
- In early July 1944, a Maccabi Palestine XI took a brief tour to Lebanon, playing two matches, against Homenetmen, losing 2–3, and against a Beirut XI, losing 0–1.
