= Israel national football team records and statistics =

Sports statistics

This article lists various football records in relation to the Israel national football team.

Records in this section refer to Eretz Israel football team from its first official game in 1934 to 1948 and to the Israel national football team since Israel Declaration of Independence in 1948.

The page is updated where necessary after each Israel match, and is correct as of 21 March 2024.

== Appearances ==
- Most appearances: Yossi Benayoun, 101; 18 November 1998 – 9 October 2017
- Longest Israel career: Yossi Benayoun, 18 years 325 days; 18 November 1998 – 9 October 2017
- Shortest Israel career: Ze'ev Haimovich, 3 minutes, 17 October 2007 v. Belarus
- Youngest player: Gai Assulin, 16 years 350 days; 26 March 2008, v. Chile
- Oldest player: Yossi Benayoun, 37 years 157 days; 9 October 2017, v. Spain
- Most appearances as a substitute: Yossi Benayoun, 33
- Most times substituted off: Eyal Berkovic, 44
- Most appearances as a substitute without ever starting a game: Ofer Shitrit, 6

== Goals ==
- First goal (as Eretz Israel): Avraham Nudelman; 16 March 1934, 1–7 v. Egypt
- First goal (as Israel): Shmuel Ben-Dror; 26 September 1948, 1–3 v. United States Olympic team
- Most goals: Eran Zahavi, 35; 2 September 2010 – 21 March 2024
- Most goals in a match: Mordechai Spiegler, 4; 25 September 1968, 4–0 v. United States
- Youngest scorer: Ben Sahar, 17 years 206 days; 28 March 2007, v. Estonia
- Oldest scorer: Avi Nimni, 33 years 231 days; 7 September 2005, v. Faroe Islands
- Youngest player to score a hat-trick: Shlomi Arbeitman; 18 years 270 days, 18 February 2004, v. Azerbaijan
- Scoring in most consecutive matches: Yehoshua Feigenbaum, 5; 28 May 1974 – 9 October 1974
- Most goals on debut: Shlomi Arbeitman, 3; 18 February 2004, 6–0 v. Azerbaijan
- Most different goalscorers in one match: 6, 18 January 1991, 7–0 v. Estonia
- Most goals scored in a single game: 9; 28 February 2001, 9–0 v. Chinese Taipei on 23 March 1988
- Most goals scored during the first half: 5 goals, 18 January 1999 v. Estonia and 6 September 1974 v. Philippines
- Most goals scored during the second half: 7, v. Chinese Taipei on 23 March 1988
- Highest scoring draw 3–3 v. United States on 15 September 1968, v. Greece on 12 March 1969, v. Wales on 8 February 1989, v. Croatia on 9 February 2005 and v. Portugal on 22 March 2013
- Largest defeat: 1–7 v. Egypt on 16 March 1934 and v. Germany on 13 February 2002
- Largest defeat at home: 0–5 v. Denmark on 13 November 1999, 2–7 v. Argentina on 4 May 1986
- Most goals conceded during a home game: 7, v. Argentina on 4 May 1986
- Most goals conceded during the first half: 4, v. Egypt on 16 March 1934 and v. Yugoslavia on 21 August 1949
- Most goals conceded during the second half: 5, v. Italy on 4 November 1961 and v. Argentina on 4 May 1986

== Managers ==
- Most AFC Asian Cup wins: Yosef Merimovich, 1
- Most matches as coach: Shlomo Scharf, 82
- Most matches won as coach: Shlomo Scharf, 31
- Most matches draws as coach: Shlomo Scharf, 18
- Youngest coach: Avram Grant, 47
