= VfB Lübeck =

Sports club

- Full name: Verein für Bewegungsspiele Lübeck von 1919 e. V.
- Founded: 1 June 1919; 107 years ago
- Ground: Stadion an der Lohmühle
- Capacity: 10,434
- Chairman: Holger Leu
- Manager: Kevin Rodewald
- League: Regionalliga Nord (IV)
- 2025–26: Regionalliga Nord, 11th of 18
- Website: https://vfb-luebeck.de
| Home colours | Away colours |

VfB Lübeck is a German association football club playing in Lübeck, Schleswig-Holstein, in the country's north. It is most known for reaching the semifinals of the German Cup in the 2003/2004 season. They played in the 2. Bundesliga from 1995 to 1997 and 2002 to 2004. Their football home stadium is the Stadion an der Lohmühle.

The club is mostly known for its football department, but it is also successful in table tennis.

== History ==
=== Foundation to WW II ===
The earliest origins of the club go back to a pair of predecessor sides; Ballsportverein Vorwärts Lübeck established on 1 April 1919 and Sportvereinigung Polizei Lübeck founded in 1921.

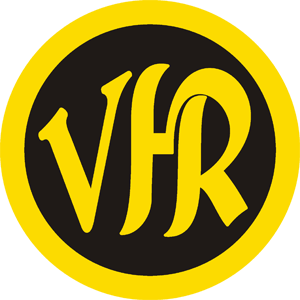
Crest of predecessor side VfR Lübeck, c. 1931.

SV Polizei Lübeck was the local police sports club. In 1931 it was merged with Verein für Rasensport Lübeck, which was the product of the 1923 union of Fußball Club Alemannia 1905 Lübeck and Lübecker Fußball Club Germania 1913. SVP played well enough to earn appearances in the playoff rounds of the senior north German circuit, but did not enjoy any success. VfR made only a single such appearance, in 1924.

BSV Vorwärts Lübeck played in the Arbeiter-Turn- und Sportbund (Worker's Gymnastic and Sport Federation) from its founding until 1933 when it was dismantled by the Nazi regime, which regarded workers sports clubs of the sort as politically undesirable. They won city championships in 1927, 1928, and 1931. The club's membership became part of SVP and the expanded association joined the Gauliga Nordmark, one of sixteen top flight divisions formed in the 1933 reorganization of German football under the Third Reich.

The club was renamed Polizei Sportverein Lübeck in 1935 and played in the Gauliga Nordmark until 1942, with its best results coming as third-place finishes. PSV made unsuccessful qualification round appearances in play for the Tschammerpokal, predecessor of today's DFB-Pokal (German Cup) in 1936–38. In 1942 the club was again renamed, becoming Sportgemeinschaft der Ordnungspolizei Lübeck, and moved to the Gauliga Schleswig-Holstein when wartime conditions forced the breakup of the Gauliga Nordmark into three more local divisions.

=== Post-war era to present ===
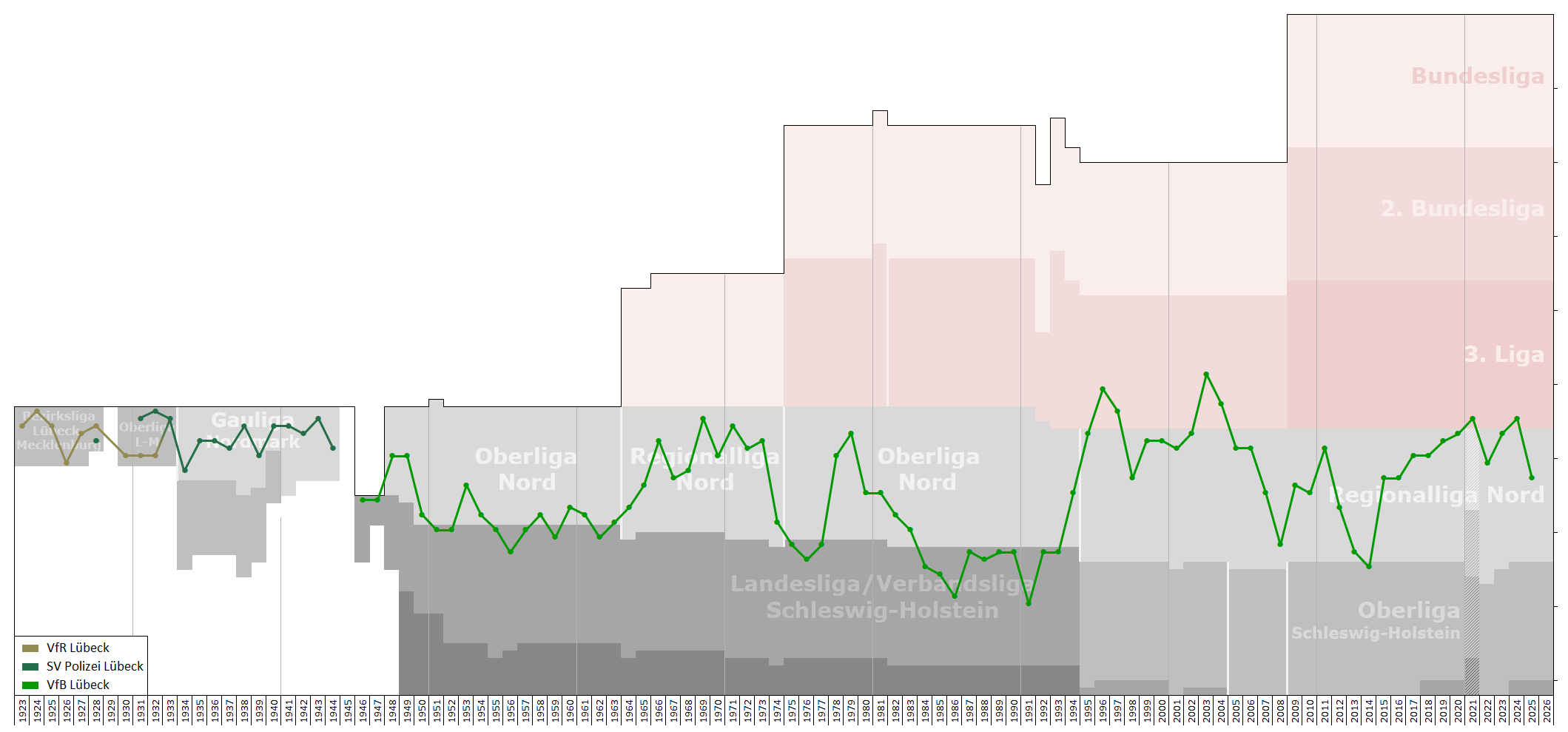
Historical chart of VfB Lübeck league performance

Following World War II organizations throughout Germany, including sports and football clubs, were dissolved by occupying Allied authorities. In 1945, the former memberships of SG OrPo and BSV Vorwärts formed a new association called Verein für Bewegungsspile Lübeck. The new club resumed play in the top flight, first in the Bezirksmeisterschaft Schleswig-Holstein, and then in 1947, in the newly formed Oberliga Nord. Over the next decade and a half VfB bounced up and down between first and second division play; they were consistently a top performer in the Amateurliga Schlewig-Holstein (II), but completely incapable of escaping the basement of the Oberliga Nord (I).

Following the 1963 formation of the Bundesliga, the country's professional first division circuit, the team settled into the Regionalliga Nord (II), generally earning mid-table results. A second-place finish in 1969 led VfB to the qualification round for the Bundesliga, where they finished last in their group with only a single point from eight matches.

After 1974, VfB slipped from the ranks of second-tier teams to fourth division Landesliga Schleswig-Holstein. They recovered a place in the 2. Bundesliga just over two decades later and resumed their role as an "elevator side", moving frequently between the second and third divisions. In 2004, the team reached the semi-finals of the DFB-Pokal (German Cup), but lost to Werder Bremen in extra time. After it was revealed that the club has been suffering from financial difficulties, it finally filed for bankruptcy at the district court Lübeck in April 2008 and was eventually forcibly relegated to the Schleswig-Holstein-Liga (V) for the 2013–14 season. After a league championship at this level and success in the promotion round the club returned to the Regionalliga (IV) in 2014. They followed up a second-place finish in 2019 with a division title in 2020 and advanced to play in the 3. Liga (III).

In July 2009, VfB Lübeck shocked Bundesliga club 1. FSV Mainz 05, beating them 2–1 after extra time in the first round of the DFB-Pokal. They were eliminated in the next round by VfB Stuttgart (3–1) after again taking a Bundesliga club into extra time. Consecutive Schleswig-Holstein-Pokal wins in 2016 and 2017, and another in 2019, led to additional DFB-Pokal appearances where the club went out in the first round each time.

== Honours ==
The club's honours:

- Regionalliga Nord (III)
  - Champions: 1995, 2002
- Regionalliga Nord (IV)
  - Champions: 2020, 2023
- Schleswig-Holstein-Liga (II/III/IV/V)
  - Champions: 1951, 1952, 1955, 1957, 1975, 1977, 1987, 1989, 1990, 1992, 1993, 2004^{‡}, 2014, 2016
- Schleswig-Holstein Cup (Tiers III–V)
  - Winners: 1956, 1987, 1992, 1998, 1999, 2000, 2001, 2006, 2009, 2010, 2012, 2015, 2016, 2019, 2022, 2023, 2025
- ^{‡} Denotes won by reserve team.

== Players ==
=== Current squad ===
As of 8 September 2026

Note: Flags indicate national team as defined under FIFA eligibility rules; some limited exceptions apply. Players may hold more than one non-FIFA nationality.

| No. | Pos. | Nation | Player |
|---|---|---|---|
| 1 | GK | GER | Finn Böhmker |
| 2 | DF | GER | Henry Jeschonek |
| 4 | DF | GER | Emmanuel Ntsiakoh |
| 5 | DF | GER | Deniz Hasan Yilmaz |
| 6 | MF | GER | Bjarne Pfundheller |
| 7 | FW | GER | Ware Pakia |
| 8 | MF | GER | Tom Kankowski |
| 9 | FW | GER | Selim Ajkic |
| 10 | MF | GER | Dardan Karimani |
| 11 | FW | DOM | Luis Coordes |
| 13 | DF | GER | Marvin Thiel |
| 14 | FW | GER | Ramiz Demir |
| 15 | MF | GER | Elario Ghassan |
| 16 | DF | GER | Jonas Dittrich |

| No. | Pos. | Nation | Player |
|---|---|---|---|
| 17 | FW | GER | Lennard Heiduck |
| 18 | FW | GER | Emmanuel Appiah |
| 19 | MF | GER | Fabian Istefo |
| 21 | FW | BFA | Daouda Beleme |
| 22 | MF | GER | Colin Ulrich |
| 23 | DF | GER | Maximilian Schütt |
| 27 | FW | AUT | Felix Mandl |
| 30 | MF | GER | Jaromir Grimm |
| 32 | GK | HAI | François Bos |
| 37 | DF | GER | Joel Amadi |
| 40 | GK | GER | Louis Siefert |
| 41 | FW | GER | Elias Al Sadi |
| 46 | DF | GER | Torben Sachau |

=== Former players ===
- (Poland) Jerzy Wijas
- (Senegal) Ali Dia
- (Germany) Jonas Toboll

== Other sports ==
In addition to its football side, the 1,000-member sports club also has departments for badminton, women's gymnastics, handball, and table tennis.
