= 1941–42 Liga Bet =

Israeli football season

The 1941–42 Liga Bet season was the second tier league of the Palestine League organized by the EIFA. The league was split into two regional divisions: North and South. The North division was won by Maccabi Netanya, while Hapoel Rehovot won the South division.

At the end of the season, the two divisional winners met in a two-legged play-off to determine promotion to top division. Maccabi Netanya won the first match 3–1, and Hapoel Rehovot won the return leg 2–0. A deciding match was never played, as the EIFA decided to promote both teams to Liga Alef.

== North division ==
Pos	Team	Pld	W	D	L	GF	GA	GR	Pts
1	Maccabi Netanya	12	11	0	1	45	4	11.250	22
2	Hapoel Netanya	12	6	1	5	23	23	1.000	13
3	Maccabi Kfar Saba	12	6	1	5	14	14	1.000	13
4	Beitar Netanya	12	6	1	5	20	24	0.833	13
5	Hapoel Hadera	12	4	2	6	16	21	0.762	10
6	Hapoel Ra'anana	12	2	4	6	11	23	0.478	8
7	Maccabi Hadera	12	2	1	9	9	29	0.310	5

== South division ==
Pos	Team	Pld	W	D	L	GF	GA	GR	Pts
1	Hapoel Rehovot	12	12	0	0	53	5	10.600	24
2	Bnei Yehuda	12	8	1	3	24	9	2.667	17
3	Mr. Barker XI	12	5	2	5	19	20	0.950	11 (Note: The second round match between Mr. Barker XI and Fire Brigade was given a 0–0 without points awarded as both teams failed to appear to the fixture.)
4	Maccabi Ramat Gan	12	5	1	6	14	27	0.519	11
5	Fire Brigade Rehovot	12	5	1	6	16	23	0.696	10
6	Hapoel HaNoar HaOved (Note: Hapoel HaNoar HaOved was originally called S.C. Montifiori and changed its name during the season.)	12	4	1	7	15	27	0.556	9
7	Egged Tel Aviv	12	0	0	12	5	35	0.143	0

Source: EIFA Memo no. 38, p.2
Notes:
- Three teams, HaTehiya Tel Aviv, Beitar Ramat Gan and Mr. Burton XI competed in the league, but withdrew before completing the first half of the season. The teams' results were annulled. Egged Tel Aviv, Hapoel HaNoar HaOved and Mr. Barker XI withdrew during the second half of the season and the remainder of their fixtures were given as 0–3 losses.
