= 1927–28 in Mandatory Palestine football =

Football in Mandatory Palestine
- Season: 1927–28

The 1927–28 season was the first season of competitive football in the British Mandate for Palestine under the Eretz Israel Football Association, which was established during the season, on 18 July 1928, and thus it can also be considered to be the first season of competitive football in Israel.

== IFA Competitions ==
=== 1928 People's Cup ===
The first State Cup, then called People's Cup was held during early 1928, with Hapoel Tel Aviv and Maccabi Hasmonean Jerusalem reaching the final. Hapoel won the cup by beating their opponents 2–0 in the final. However, the cup was later shared, as Maccabi Hasmonean appealed the result to the EIFA.

26 May 1928

Maccabi Hasmonean Jerusalem	0–2	Hapoel Allenby Tel Aviv
		66' Poliakov; 81' Nudelman

Old Maccabi Tel Aviv ground
Attendance: 6000
Referee: Adams

== Mond Cup ==
During a visit to Palestine, Sir Alfred Mond suggested a forming a Jewish unified team to tour The UK. In order to set the squad of the team which will be sent abroad, a competition, named "Mond Cup", in honor of Sir Mond, was organized between the four top Jewish teams, Maccabi Tel Aviv, Hapoel Tel Aviv, Hapoel Haifa and Maccabi Hasmonean Jerusalem in which The four teams would play each other in a league format, after which the best players would be selected to the team. Eventually, after the competition, due to disagreements between the clubs no team was composed and the tour did not take place. The competition included the first ever competitive Tel Aviv derby match, which was played at Maccabi ground on 24 June 1928 and resulted in a 1–1 draw. The return fixture, played on 21 July 1928 was won 3–1 by Hapoel.

Pos	Team	Pld	W	D	L	GF	GA	GD	Pts
1	Hapoel Tel Aviv	6	3	2	1	12	4	+8	8
2	Hapoel Haifa	6	4	0	2	13	8	+5	8
3	Maccabi Tel Aviv	5	2	1	2	12	9	+3	5
4	Maccabi Hasmonean Jerusalem	5	0	1	4	4	20	−16	1

=== Results ===
Home \ Away	HHA	HTA	MHJ	MTA
Hapoel Haifa		2–0	4–3	1–0
Hapoel Tel Aviv	1–0		7–0	3–1
Maccabi Jerusalem	0–3	0–0		1–6
Maccabi Tel Aviv	4–3	1–1	– (Note: The match between Maccabi Tel Aviv and Maccabi Hasmonean Jerusalem, which was postponed from 16 June 1928 to 28 July 1928, was not played as both teams were already lost chance to top the table.)	

Legend: Blue = home team win; Yellow = draw; Red = away team win.

== Notable events ==
- The first known match played by Hapoel Kfar Saba was held against Hapoel Magdiel in autumn 1927, and resulted in a 4–1 victory.
- On 13 October 1927, Maccabi Tiberias celebrated the inauguration of its stadium in the presence of several dignitaries, including the president of the World Zionist Organization, and later President of Israel, Chaim Weizmann, with several sport events, including a match against Maccabi HaGibor Haifa, which ended with a 1–0 loss to the hosts.
- On 12 November 1927, Hapoel Tel Aviv ground was opened with a match between the hosts and Wireless Company from Sarafand, resulting in a 2–1 to Hapoel.
- During the second half of November 1927 Maccabi Hasmonean Jerusalem took a brief tour in Egypt, playing against two teams, International of Cairo, losing 2–5, on 20 November 1927, and Athos club of Alexandria on 27 November 1927, drawing 1–1.
- On 25 February 1928, Maccabi Tel Aviv hosted Hapoel Tel Aviv on Maccabi ground for the first ever Tel Aviv derby. Maccabi won the match 3–0, A week later Hapoel hosted a rematch, this time Maccabi won 2–1.
- In mid-March Hapoel Haifa went to Beirut upon invitation of the American College. The planned match between the teams did not take place, and Hapoel played only one match, against a Beirut XI, winning 4–1.
- On 7 April 1928 and 11 April 1928 Maccabi Tel Aviv and Hapoel Tel Aviv met for a double set of matches, the first was won by Maccabi 4–0, while Hapoel recorded its first ever derby win on the second match, 1–0.
- Hapoel Haifa and Hapoel Tel Aviv met in a two-legged tie for the Po'alei Mahane HaYarden Cup (Hebrew: גביע פועלי מחנה הירדן, lit. Jordan Camp Workers Cup). On 31 March 1928 Hapoel Tel Aviv won the first match in Haifa 2–0. The second match, played on 14 April 1928, and kicked off by noted Belgian statesman Emile Vandervelde, was abandoned with a score of 1–1 after a Hapoel Haifa player was sent off and the team left the field in protest.
