= Jerzy Wijas =

Polish footballer

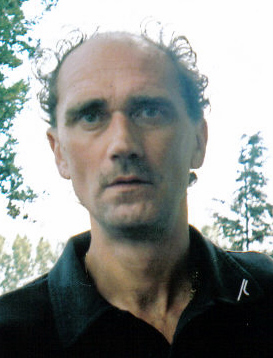

Personal information
- Full name: Jerzy Ernest Wijas
- Date of birth: 12 February 1959 (age 67)
- Place of birth: Mysłowice, Poland
- Positions: Defender; midfielder

Senior career*
Years	Team	Apps	(Gls)
–1982	Górnik 09 Mysłowice		
1982–1983	GKS Katowice	26	(0)
1983–1985	Widzew Łódź	45	(1)
1985-1986	Czarni Czarne		
1986–1990	GKS Katowice	106	(9)
1990-1991	Hapoel Kfar Saba		
1991–1992	VfB Lübeck		
1992–1993	VfL Osnabrück	37	(2)
1993–1995	KSV Hessen Kassel	27	(2)
1995–1997	MKS Lędziny		
1997–1999	LKS Stara Wieś		

International career
1983–1989	Poland	17	(0)
- * Club domestic league appearances and goals

Jerzy Ernest Wijas (born 12 February 1959) is a Polish former professional footballer.

== Honours ==
Widzew Łódź

- Polish Cup: 1984–85

Hapoel Kfar Saba

- Israel State Cup: 1989–90
