= 1989 Israel Super Cup =

Maccabi Haifa	Beitar Jerusalem
2	1
- Date: 26 August 1989
- Venue: Kiryat Eliezer Stadium, Haifa
- Referee: Ovadia Ben-Itzhak
- Attendance: 5000

The 1989 Israel Super Cup was the 18th Israel Super Cup (23rd, including unofficial matches, as the competition wasn't played within the Israel Football Association in its first 5 editions, until 1969), an annual Israel football match played between the winners of the previous season's Top Division and Israel State Cup.

The match was played between Maccabi Haifa, champions of the 1988–89 Liga Leumit and Beitar Jerusalem, winners of the 1988–89 Israel State Cup.

This was Maccabi Haifa's 4th Israel Super Cup appearance (including unofficial matches) and Beitar's 6th. Watched by a crowd of 5,000 at Kiryat Eliezer Stadium, Maccabi Haifa won the match 2–0.

== Match details ==
26 August 1989

Maccabi Haifa	2–1	Beitar Jerusalem
Klinger 31', 57'		Shirazi 72'

Kiryat Eliezer Stadium, Haifa
Attendance: 5,000
Referee: Ovadia Ben-Itzhak
