= 1941–42 in Mandatory Palestine football =

Football in Mandatory Palestine
- Season: 1941–42

The 1941–42 season was the 15th season of competitive football in the British Mandate for Palestine under the Eretz Israel Football Association.

== EIFA Competitions ==
=== 1941–42 Palestine League ===
The top division was divided to three regional leagues, in Jerusalem, Tel Aviv and Haifa, with the intention to set a national champions through play-offs between the three league winners. However, as the Haifa league was cancelled in March 1942, Only two divisional champion remained to be set. Due to the ongoing war, league matches were delayed and were held over to the next season and the play-offs were held in fall 1943.

The second division was divided into two regional leagues, won by Maccabi Netanya (North division) and Hapoel Rehovot. The two clubs played for promotion to top division, each club winning one of the two-legged tie. A third, decisive match was not played as the EIFA decided to promote both clubs.

=== 1941 Palestine Cup ===
The cup competition, which usually was played during the spring, was delayed to fall 1941 and was played between 20 September and 15 November 1941. Maccabi Tel Aviv and Hapoel Tel Aviv met in the final, the former winning 2–1.

15 November 1941

Maccabi Tel Aviv	2–1	Hapoel Tel Aviv
Fritzner 53'; Sidi 87'		Philosof 43'

Maccabiah Stadium
Attendance: 10,000
Referee: Markus

=== 1942 Palestine Cup ===
The second cup competition of the season was held in its usual spring schedule, starting on 14 February 1941. The competition was delayed over an unresolved first round tie between Maccabi Haifa and Hapoel Petah Tikva and over a disciplinary hearing for cup holders Maccabi Tel Aviv who fielded ineligible players in their quarter-final tie against Shabab el-Arab. In the final, Beitar Tel Aviv defeated Maccabi Haifa by a record score of 12–1.

4 July 1942

Beitar Tel Aviv	12–1	Maccabi Haifa
Spiegel; Wermes; Bogdanov; Schneor; Grinwald; Dvorin 89' (pen.)		Schalfenberg 40'

Maccabiah Stadium
Attendance: 3000
Referee: Yon

=== Haifa Cup ===
After the cancellation of the Haifa division, the EIFA set a cup competition for the region's team. 13 teams took part in the competition – 3 Arab clubs, 2 Jewish and 8 British. The competition was played as a two-legged tie in each round, including the final, which was played during spring 1942. Hapoel Haifa won the cup, defeating British Army team Bees XI 9–4 (on aggregate) in the final.

==== First round ====
Team 1	Agg.	Team 2	1st leg	2nd leg
Zebra's XI	1–8	Squad Leader Frews XI	1–2	0–6
Shabab el-Arab Haifa	2–4	Islamic Haifa	2–1	0–3
Gilchrist's XI	6–2	Harrison's XI	3–2	3–0
Hapoel Haifa	8–1	Maccabi Haifa	4–1	4–0
Major. Holdsworth's XI	7–4	Aces XI	3–0	4–4

==== Quarter-finals ====
Team 1	Agg.	Team 2	1st leg	2nd leg
Tersana	w/o	Gilchrist's XI	–	–
Major. Holdsworth's XI	5–6	Squad Leader Frews XI	3–3	2–3
Hapoel Haifa	4–3	Islamic Haifa	2–1	2–2
Bees XI	4–3	Detheridge XI	2–2	2–1

==== Semi-finals ====
Team 1	Agg.	Team 2	1st leg	2nd leg
Gilchrist's XI	2–3	Hapoel Haifa	1–2	1–1
Squad Leader Frews XI	1–5	Bees XI	1–2	0–3

==== Final ====
Team 1	Agg.	Team 2	1st leg	2nd leg
Hapoel Haifa	9–4	Bees XI	2–4	7–0

=== North Cup ===
On request from Hapoel teams in Jezreel Valley and Jordan Valley a cup competition was organized for the teams in the region. The competition was regionalized between the two valleys, with the winners meeting in the final. Hapoel Geva and Hapoel Ma'agan, winners of the regional cups, met in the final, played at Geva, with the hosts winning 2–1 to claim the North Cup.

==== Regional cups ====
Jezreel Valley Cup

Home team	Score	Away team
First round
Army XI	3–1	Hapoel Afula
Hapoel Balfouria	5–1	Mr. Radley XI
	–	
Semi-finals
Hapoel Balfouria	3–2	Hapoel Gvat/Ginegar
Hapoel Geva	5–0	Army XI
Final
Hapoel Geva	6–2	Hapoel Balfouria

Jordan Valley Cup

Home team	Score	Away team
First Round
Hapoel Ma'agan	w/o	Hapoel Tiberias
Hapoel Beit Zera	4–1	Hapoel Afikim
Hapoel Yavne'el	w/o	Hapoel Kinneret
Semi-finals
Hapoel Beit Zera	1–0	Hapoel Ashdot Ya'akov
Hapoel Ma'agan	w/o	Hapoel Yavne'el
Final
Hapoel Ma'agan	5–1	Hapoel Beit Zera

==== Final ====
6 June 1942

Hapoel Geva	2–1	Hapoel Ma'agan
	Report

Geva Football Field
Referee: Wolfson

== Notable events ==
- Wanderers, a British Army team composed of professional footballers stationed in the Middle East, such as Micky Fenton, Teddy Maguire and Tom Woodward, visited Mandatory Palestine during its December tour, during which the team also played in Ankara, Istanbul and Egypt. The team played a Palestine XI, a team composed of Jewish and Arab players, as well as military personnel from units serving in Palestine, including members of the British and the Greek armies, on 26 December 1941, winning 8–3. The visitors were leading 8–0 at half-time, when Palestine subbed their goalkeeper, Habbab from Al-Ahly Jaffa, for Melika from Hapoel Tel Aviv, who kept a clean sheet for the rest of the match.
- On 28 March 1942, Beitar Tel Aviv hosted Homenetmen Beirut for a single match, played at the Maccabiah Stadium. Beitar won 3–0 with goals from Eliezer Spiegel, Shraga Grinwald and Natan Panz. The visiting team played another match, against their Jerusalem counterparts, which they won 4–1.
