= Yossi Malka =

Israeli footballer

Yossi Malka יוסי מלכה
Personal information
- Full name: Yossi Malka
- Date of birth: 5 September 1974 (age 52)
- Place of birth: Netanya, Israel
- Position: Center back

Youth career
- Maccabi Netanya

Senior career*
Years	Team	Apps	(Gls)
1994–1997	Maccabi Netanya	89	(9)
1997–1998	Hapoel Haifa		
1998–1999	Maccabi Ironi Ashdod	20	(0)
1999–2001	Maccabi Netanya	14	(1)
2001–2002	Maccabi Ironi Kiryat Ata		

International career
1991	Israel U-17	2	(0)
1994	Israel U-21	1	(0)
- * Club domestic league appearances and goals

Yossi Malka (Hebrew: יוסי מלכה), is an Israeli former footballer who played for Maccabi Netanya.

He is of a Tunisian-Jewish descent.

== Honours ==
- Second Division
  - 1998–99
