= Jonas Toboll =

German footballer

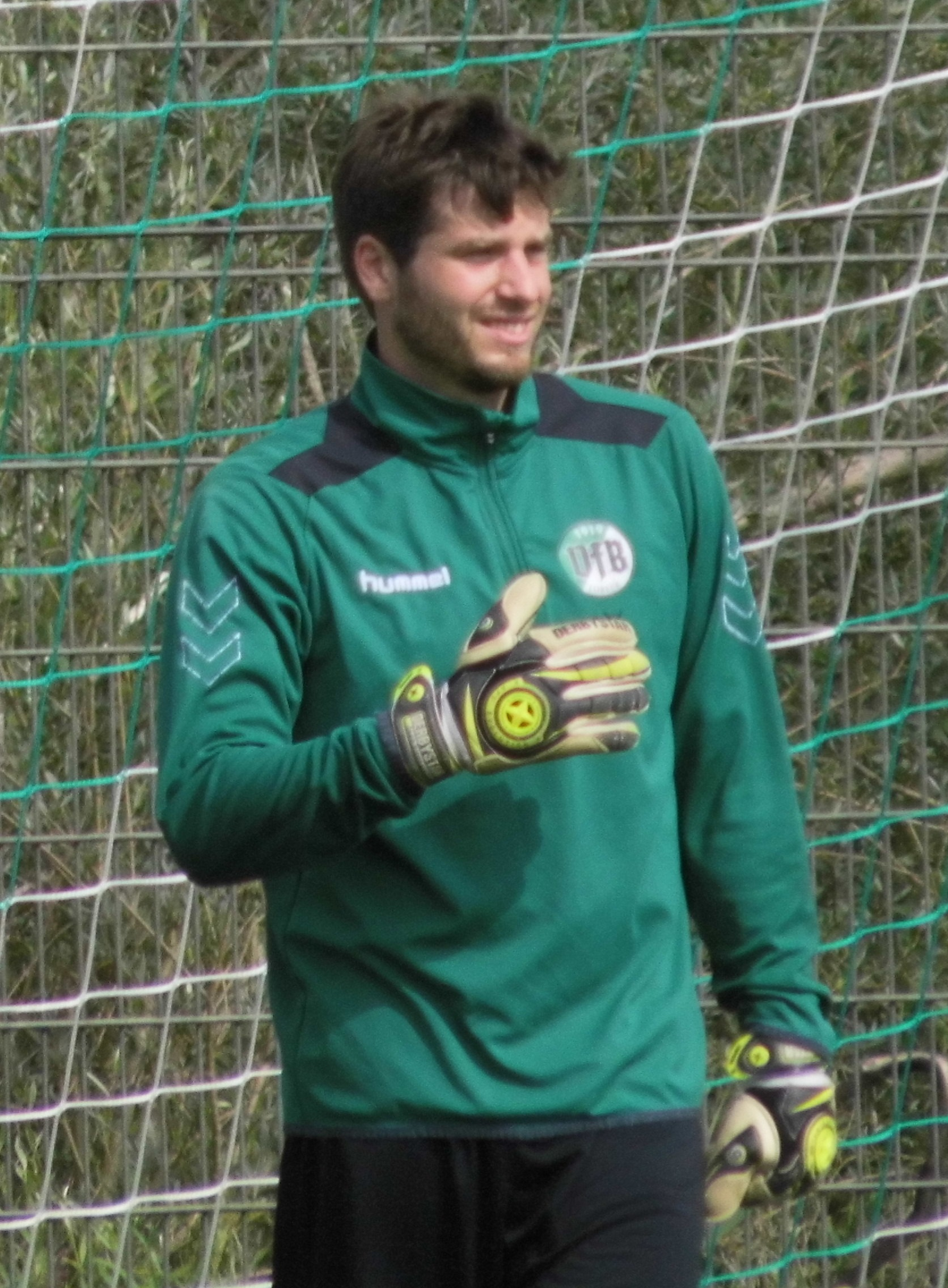
- Toboll in 2015

Personal information
- Date of birth: 10 June 1987 (age 39)
- Place of birth: Hamburg, West Germany
- Height: 1.89 m (6 ft 2 in)
- Position: Goalkeeper

Youth career
- SV Wistedt
- Rot-Weiß Scheeßel
- –2005: Werder Bremen

Senior career*
| Years | Team | Apps | (Gls) |
| 2005–2008 | Rotenburger SV | | |
| 2008–2009 | Kickers Emden | 1 | (0) |
| 2010 | SV Drochtersen/Assel | 13 | (0) |
| 2010–2011 | FC Oberneuland | 29 | (0) |
| 2011–2017 | VfB Lübeck | 169 | (0) |
| 2011–2013 | VfB Lübeck II | 2 | (0) |
- * Club domestic league appearances and goals

Jonas Toboll (born 10 June 1987) is a German former footballer who played as a goalkeeper.

== Career ==
Toboll made his professional debut for Kickers Emden in the 3. Liga on May 13, 2009, starting in the home match against VfB Stuttgart II, which ended in 2–1 win.
