= Vladimir Andonov =

Bulgarian footballer

Vladimir Andonov (born 16 August 1975) is a retired Bulgarian footballer.

He played for CSKA Sofia in his home country. Later playing for Bnei Yehuda Tel Aviv from 2001 to 2003, he had a short spell in Levski Sofia before returning to Israel where he played for Hapoel Be'er Sheva and Maccabi Petah Tikva until 2005.
