= Ehud Ben-Tovim =

Israeli footballer

Ehud Ben-Tovim אהוד בן טובים
Personal information
- Date of birth: 12 August 1952 (age 74)
- Place of birth: Tel Aviv, Israel
- Position: Striker

Senior career*
Years	Team	Apps	(Gls)
1969–1989	Bnei Yehuda	445	(166)
1978	→ Oakland Stompers (loan)	1	(0)
1989–1990	Hapoel Rishon LeZion		

International career
1978	Israel	2	(0)
- * Club domestic league appearances and goals

Ehud Ben-Tovim (Hebrew: אהוד בן טובים) is a former Israeli international footballer and widely regarded as the greatest talent that Bnei Yehuda Tel Aviv F.C. has ever produced. After a long period of distrust and angst between Bnei Yehuda and Ben-Tovim, he was appointed manager of the youth team in 2006.

== Biography ==
=== Attempted move to Beitar Jerusalem ===
After the 1978–79 season, Ehud Ben-Tovim requested a raise from his boyhood club, Bnei Yehuda. After being denied the raise, he vented his frustrations with the Israeli media to which the club's chairmen replied that if he wanted to leave, he should pay IL700,000. After almost signing with Hapoel Be'er Sheva, Beitar Jerusalem stepped in and completed a deal with Bnei Yehuda within two days. When the transaction was complete, Bnei Yehuda fans protested in the streets of Tel Aviv, burning tires and stopping all public transportation. Riot police dispersed the crowd who renewed the protests the following day. Eventually, Ben-Tovim returned to Bnei Yehuda and Beitar received their money back.
