= 1952–53 in Israeli football =

Football in Israel
- Season: 1952–53

The 1952–53 season was the fifth season of competitive football in Israel and the 27th season under the Israeli Football Association, established in 1928, during the British Mandate.

== IFA Competitions ==
The first part of the season was marred by another dispute between Hapoel and Maccabi factions in the IFA, delaying the beginning of the league and cup competitions. The dispute was settled at the beginning of 1953, allowing the competitions to start at the second part of the season. Due to the delayed start, the competition were not complete until the summer break and were continued in the next season.

== National Teams ==
=== National team ===
No official matches were played by the national team during the season. Two matches by the national team were played during November 1952 against a select XI from Athens, Greece, and the matches were billed as Tel Aviv vs. Athens. Tel Aviv won the first match 5–0 and lost the other 1–3.
