= Einat =

Kibbutz in central Israel

Einat: עֵינַת (Hebrew)
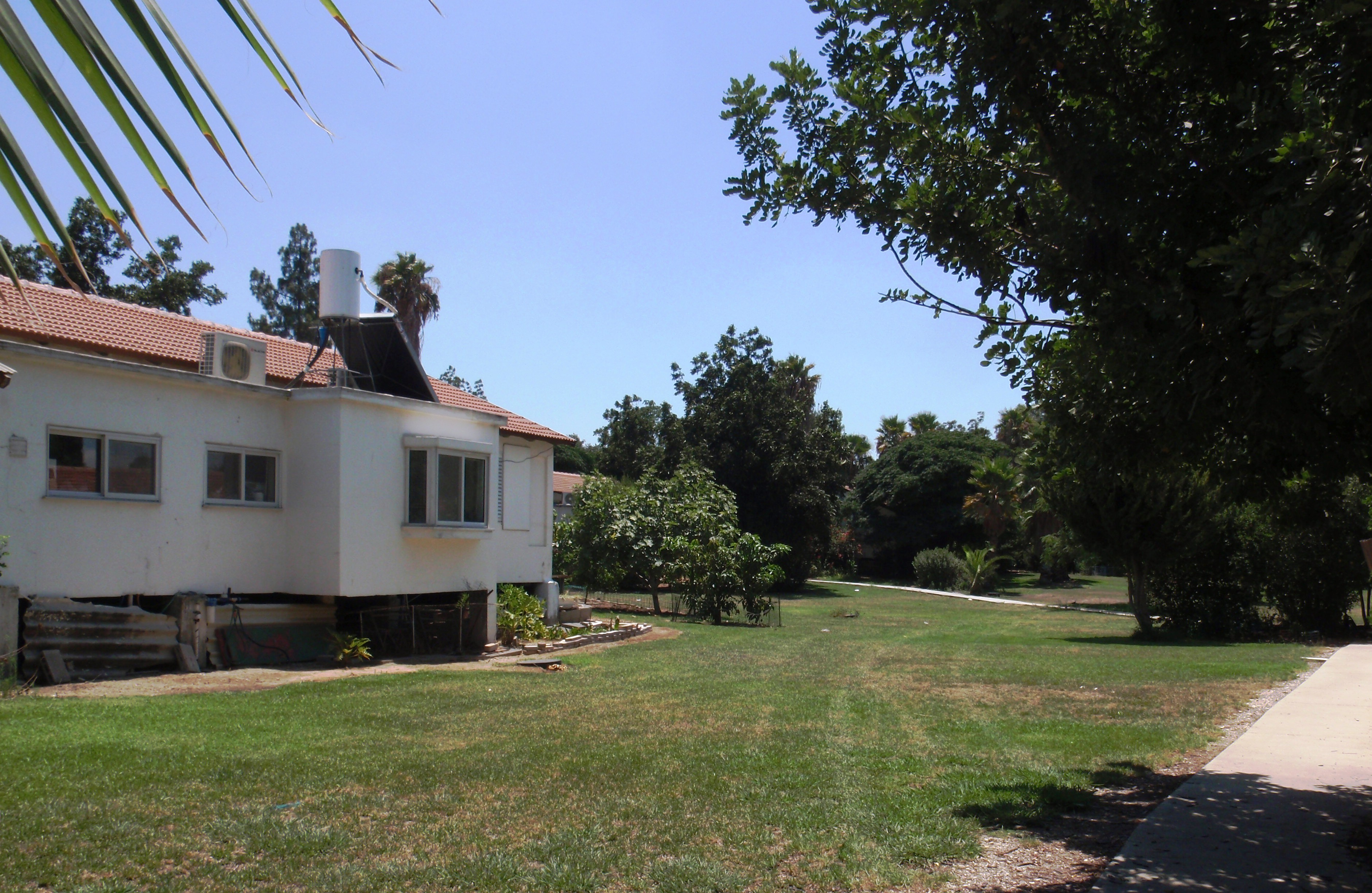

- Location within Central Israel Location within Israel
- Coordinates: 32°4′57″N 34°56′21″E
- Country: Israel
- District: Central
- Subdistrict: Petah Tikva
- Council: Drom HaSharon
- Affiliation: Kibbutz Movement
- Founded: 1952
- Founder: Members of Givat HaShlosha and Ramat HaKovesh
- Population (2024): 924
- Website: www.einat.org.il

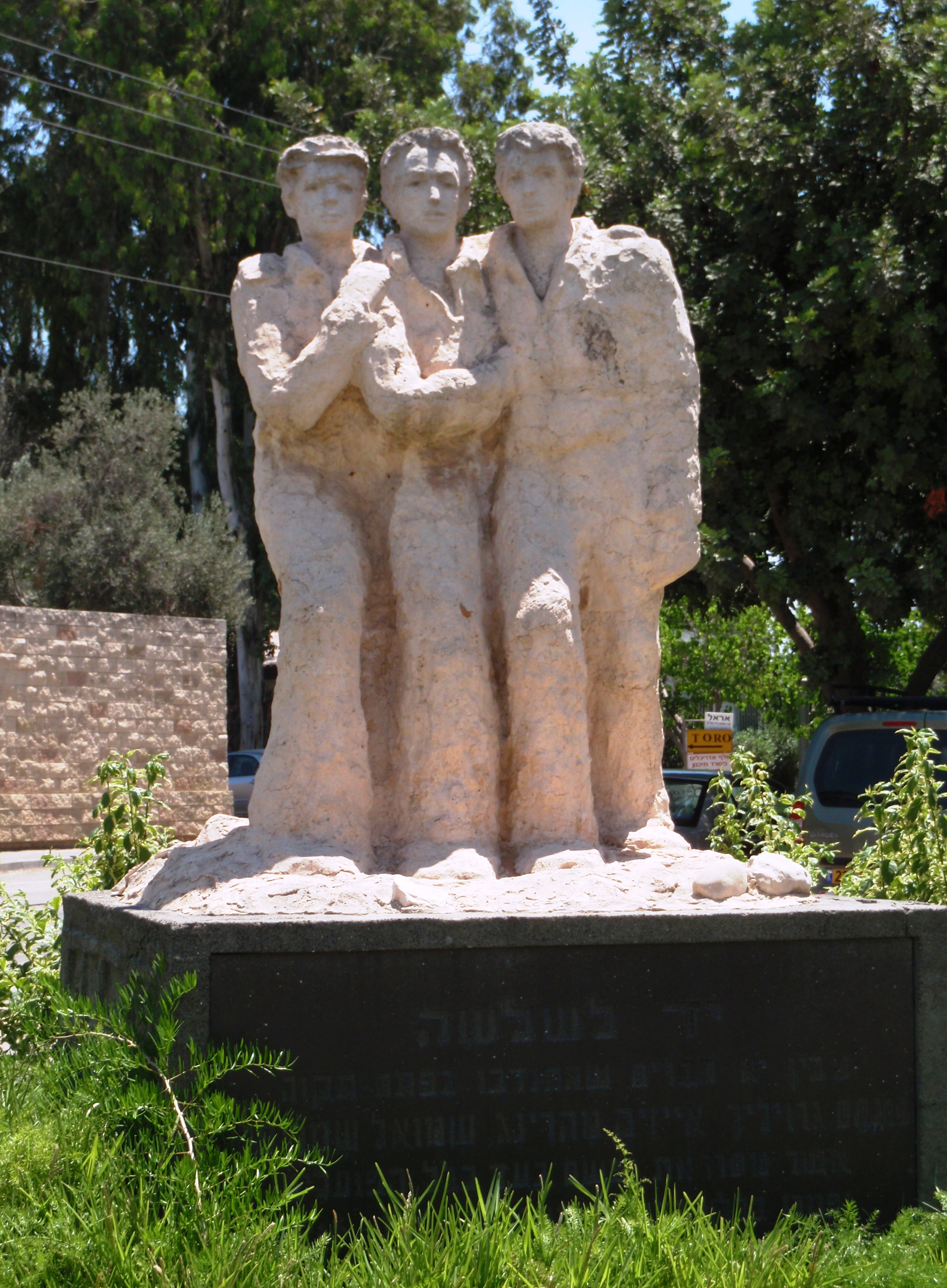
Yad Lashlosha memorial

Einat (Hebrew: עֵינַת) is a kibbutz in central Israel. Located near Petah Tikva and south of Rosh HaAyin, it falls under the jurisdiction of Drom HaSharon Regional Council. In 2024 it had a population of 924.

== History ==
The kibbutz was founded in 1952 by residents of Givat HaShlosha and Ramat HaKovesh who had left the HaKibbutz HaMeuhad after its ideological split. The name was derived from its proximity to the source ("ein") of the Yarkon River.

== Economy ==
The kibbutz was privatized, which encouraged children of members to return. The kibbutz operates a banquet hall and a secular cemetery that offers non-religious Israelis a burial option that skirts the religious establishment. Together with Kibbutz Givat HaShlosha, Einat owns Noga-Einat, a factory established in 1930 that produces combat boots and shoes for the army, police and special forces.

== Civil cemetery ==
Einat was the first kibbutz to respond to the demand in Israel for secular burial. In 1991, it began to accept requests from people with no religious affiliation seeking an alternative to the Jewish burial ceremony.
