= 1949–50 in Israeli football =

Football in Israel
- Season: 1949–50

Men's football
- Israeli League: Maccabi Tel Aviv
- Liga Meuhedet: Hapoel Kiryat Haim; Hapoel Hadera; Maccabi Ramat Gan; Bnei Yehuda; Hapoel Jerusalem

The 1949–50 season was the second season of competitive football in Israel and the 24th season under the Israeli Football Association, established in 1928, during the British Mandate.

== IFA Competitions ==
=== League competitions ===
==== Israeli League ====
The league competition, which started in the Previous season, finished during the season. Maccabi Tel Aviv won the inaugural Israeli championship. Maccabi Nes Tziona finished bottom of the league and was due to be relegated. However, as disagreement broke out between the Hapoel and Maccabi factions in the IFA, the next league season didn't start until fall 1951, the club's relegation, which was part of the disagreement, wasn't confirmed until mid-1951.

==== Liga Meuhedet ====
Hapoel Kiryat Haim, Hapoel Hadera, Maccabi Ramat Gan, Bnei Yehuda and Hapoel Jerusalem As the IFA established the league system, 25 teams were placed in Liga Bet. As the placing of teams to Liga Bet was part of the disagreements between the two IFA factions (with each wants more of its own teams in Liga Alef and Liga Bet), the teams placed in Liga Bet were selected not only based on placing in Liga Meuhedet.

== National teams ==
=== National team ===
==== 1950 World Cup qualification (group 3), first round ====
Pos	Team	Pld	W	D	L	GF	GA	GD	Pts
1	Yugoslavia	2	2	0	0	11	2	+9	4
2	Israel	2	0	0	2	2	11	−9	0

==== 1949–50 matches ====
30 July 1949 friendly	Israel	3–1	Cyprus	Tel Aviv
	Wermes 10', 42'; Yalovski 68'	Report	George Himonides 14'	Stadium: Maccabiah Stadium; Attendance: 9,000; Referee: (Israel) Huppert

21 August 1949 WCQ	Yugoslavia	6–0	Israel	Belgrade
	Pajević 12', 19', 26'; Senčar 44'; Ž. Čajkovski 63'; Bobek 83' (pen.)	Report		Stadium: JNA Stadion; Attendance: 35,000; Referee: (Italy) Giovanni Galeati

18 September 1949 WCQ	Israel	2–5	Yugoslavia	Tel Aviv
	Glazer 65', 76'	Report	Valok 19', 64'; Bobek 20'; Z. Čajkovski 41'; Ž. Čajkovski 82'	Stadium: Maccabiah Stadium; Attendance: 20,000; Referee: (Cyprus) Yosef Kinstlich
