= Givat HaShlosha =

Kibbutz in central Israel

Givat HaShlosha: גִּבְעַת הַשְּׁלֹשָׁה (Hebrew); جفعات هشلوشا (Arabic)
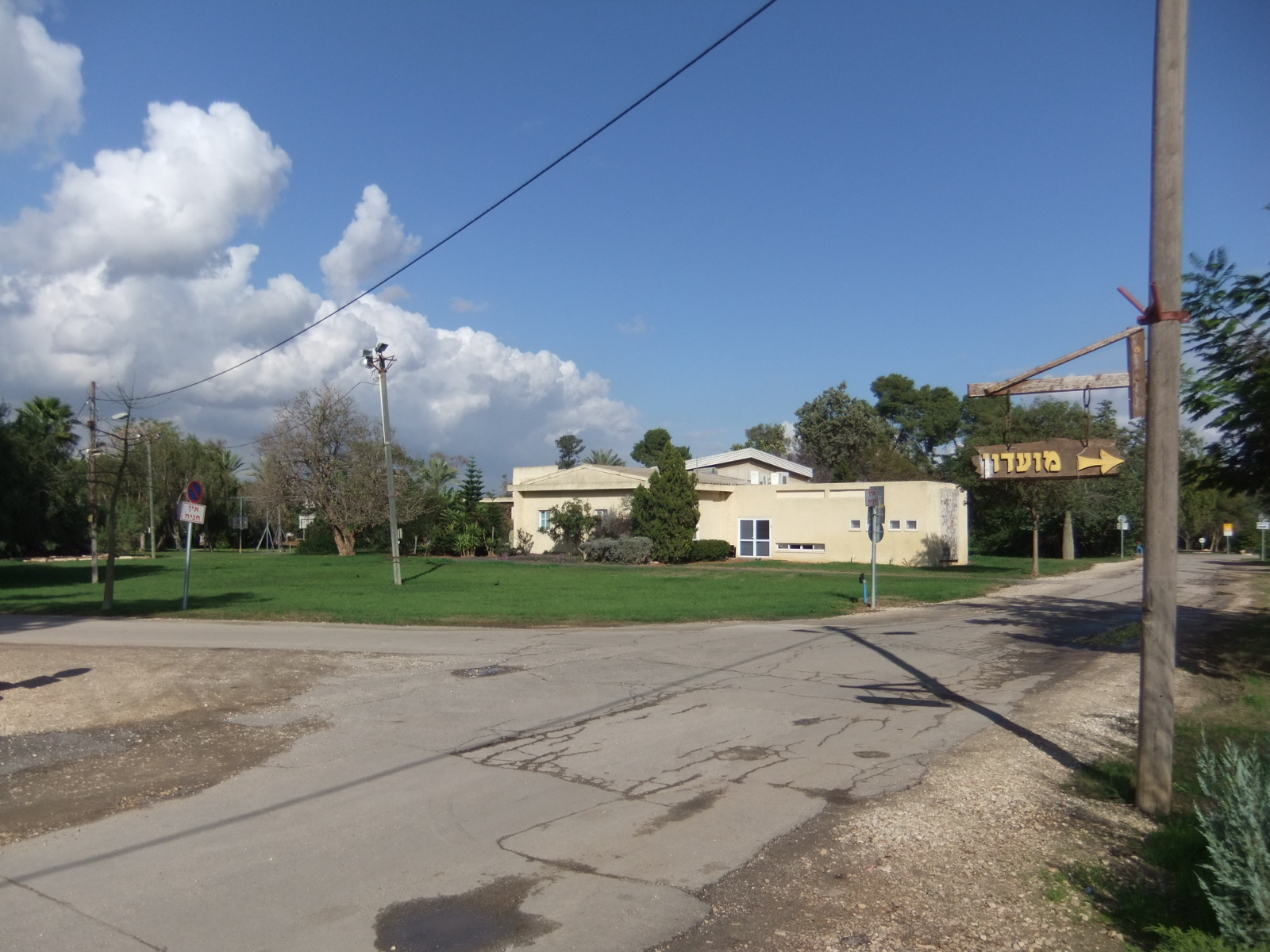

- Location within Central Israel
- Coordinates: 32°5′54″N 34°55′16″E
- Country: Israel
- District: Central
- Subdistrict: Petah Tikva
- Council: Drom HaSharon
- Affiliation: Kibbutz Movement
- Founded: 1 May 1925
- Founder: Polish HeHalutz Members
- Population (2024): 742

Givat HaShlosha (Hebrew: גִּבְעַת הַשְּׁלֹשָׁה, lit. Hill of the three) is a kibbutz in central Israel. Located about 4 km east of Petah Tikva, near the Yarkon river, it falls under the jurisdiction of Drom Hasharon Regional Council. In 2024 it had a population of 742.

== Etymology ==
The kibbutz is named for the three workers from Petah Tikva who were accused of espionage during World War I (Palestine was then under the rule of the Ottoman Empire), and were sent to a prison in Damascus. They were tortured and died in 1916.

== History ==
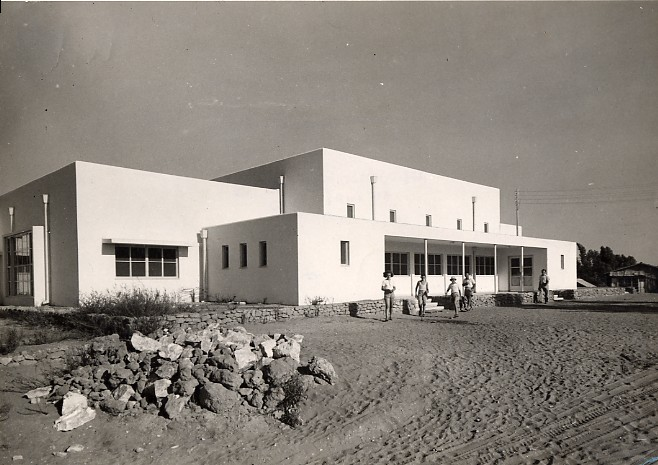
Historic dining room, c 1939

The kibbutz was founded on 1 May 1925, by a group from the Zionist pioneering HeHalutz movement originating in the city of Klesów in Poland (now Klesiv, Ukraine). Its original site was at a location west of Petah Tikva, which is now within the city, near the intersection of Arlozorov and Tzahal streets.

A regional agricultural school was located on the outskirts of Givat Hashlosha. Yitzhak Rabin, later prime minister of Israel, was a student there in 1935-1937. Later it was named after Rosa Cohen, Rabin's mother. The site is now an urban farm and teacher training college.

In 1953 Givat HaShlosha was moved to its current position; on the land of the newly depopulated Palestinian village of Majdal Yaba.

Today, a geriatric institution belonging to Tel Aviv is located at Givat HaShlosha. One of the largest dining halls in Mandatory Palestine operated in the kibbutz, designed by Israeli architect Aryeh Sharon along other buildings in the kibbutz.

In the era before the founding of the state of Israel, Givat HaShlosha was one of the kibbutzim where the Palmach trained, and it had weapons caches for the Haganah. Subsequently, it was raided by the British Army during Operation Agatha.

When Holocaust survivors arrived in Israel, the kibbutz absorbed many young people.

By 1950, Kibbutz Givat Hashlosha was one of the largest in the country, with close to 900 members. In 1952, an ideological dispute led to the construction of a brick wall in the center of the dining hall to separate the two groups and finally the establishment of a new kibbutz, Einat near Rosh HaAyin.

== Economy ==
In 1968, Givat Hashlosha had 510 inhabitants. Its farming is highly intensive, with citrus fruits and other crops, dairy farming and cattle. The kibbutz has a shoe factory and a plant for building materials. The kibbutz operates a secular cemetery where many well-known personalities have been buried, among them Mishael Cheshin and Yossi Sarid.

== Notable people ==
- Rehavam Ze'evi (1926–2001), general and politician
- Uri Lifschitz (1936–2011), painter
