= 1942–43 in Mandatory Palestine football =

Football in Mandatory Palestine
- Season: 1942–43

The 1942–43 season was the 16th season of competitive football in the British Mandate for Palestine under the Eretz Israel Football Association.

== IFA Competitions ==
=== 1941–42 Palestine League ===
League matches, which started during the previous season were continued during the season. The Jerusalem division was completed during the season, while the Southern division had one match, between Maccabi Tel Aviv and Maccabi Nes Tziona, left to complete. This match was played on 4 September 1943.

==== Southern division table ====
Pos	Team	Pld	W	D	L	GF	GA	GR	Pts	Qualification or relegation
1	Maccabi Rishon LeZion	26	20	3	3	87	22	3.955	43	Championship Playoffs
2	Maccabi Tel Aviv	26	21	1	4	82	26	3.154	43	Championship Playoffs
3	Maccabi Nes Tziona	26	19	3	4	69	31	2.226	41	
4	Hapoel Tel Aviv	26	19	2	5	87	23	3.783	40	
5	Maccabi Petah Tikva	26	15	2	9	54	38	1.421	32	
6	Hapoel Petah Tikva	26	13	5	8	55	49	1.122	31	
7	Beitar Tel Aviv	26	11	4	11	50	48	1.042	25 (Note: Hapoel Rishon LeZion's matches against Beitar Tel Aviv and Degel Zion Tel Aviv were both given as 0–0 without points due to infringements from both involved clubs (in each match).)	
8	National Sport Club Jaffa	26	11	3	12	55	55	1.000	25	
9	Hapoel Ramat Gan	26	9	4	13	54	67	0.806	22	
10	Maccabi Rehovot	26	8	5	13	34	50	0.680	21	
11	Hapoel Herzliya	26	4	3	19	27	66	0.409	11	
12	Hapoel Rishon LeZion	26	5	2	19	26	71	0.366	10	
13	Hakoah Tel Aviv	26	4	1	21	27	95	0.284	9	
14	Degel Zion Tel Aviv	26	1	6	19	11	77	0.143	7	

Updated to match(es) played on 4 September 1943. Source: Memo no. 11, p. 3 IFA (in Hebrew)
Rules for classification: 1) points; 2) goal ratio.

==== Jerusalem division table (top 3) ====
Pos	Team	Pld	W	D	L	GF	GA	GR	Pts	Qualification or relegation
1	Homenetmen Jerusalem	14	10	3	1	38	10	3.800	23	
2	Maccabi Jerusalem	14	10	2	2	28	9	3.111	22	
3	Hapoel Jerusalem	14	8	3	3	28	12	2.333	19	
4	Degel Zion Jerusalem	14	5	5	4	15	16	0.938	14 (Note: The match between Degel Zion Jerusalem and Christian Club Jerusalem was given as a 0–0 without points, due to infringements on behalf of both teams.)	
5	Christian Club Jerusalem	14	5	2	7	19	23	0.826	11	
6	Hoyetchmen Club Jerusalem	14	4	2	8	21	36	0.583	10	
7	R.A.P.C.	14	3	1	10	11	30	0.367	7	
8	Araks Jerusalem	14	2	0	12	8	32	0.250	4	
9	R.A.M.C. (Note: The team representing the Royal Army Medical Corps withdrew from the competition and its results were annulled.)	14	3	7	4	1	6	0.167	13	Withdrew
10	Elitzur Jerusalem (Note: Elitzur Jerusalem withdrew from the competition and its results were annulled.)	14	14	0	0	10	1	10.000	28	Withdrew

Updated to match(es) played on 4 September 1943. Source: Memo no. 11, p. 3 IFA (in Hebrew)
Rules for classification: 1) points; 2) goal ratio.

=== 1943 Palestine Cup ===
A cup competition was held during spring 1943, which was called The Wartime Cup. Early round matches were regionalized, with the four divisional winners meeting in the semi-finals. The early rounds of the competition were played during the season, with the semi-finals and final being delayed to the start of the next season.

== Notable events ==
- Osud Al-Shahba (Aleppo Lions) visited Tel Aviv on 31 October 1942, playing a single match against Maccabi Tel Aviv, winning 6–2.
- Corinthians, a team composed of British professional players stationed in the Middle East played several matches in Palestine in December 1942 and Between 27 February and 4 April 1943, playing against British, Jewish and Arab teams. In December, the team had beaten a British Police XI 3–2 and a Maccabi XI 2–1. In the team's second visit, the team had played twice against Hapoel XI, winning 6–2 and 3–2, twice against YMCA Jerusalem, winning 4–3 and 4–2, and once against a Jewish Settlement Police XI, winning 7–3. Corinthians also played a match in Jerusalem against Wanderers, another team composed of British professional players, losing 0–3.
- Wanderers, which visited Palestine during the previous season, played three matches during March 1943. The team, with players such as Tom Cooper, Albert Cox and Tom Finney, won 8–0 against an RAF XI, and drew 0 – 0 against Maccabi XI, before continuing their tour to Lebanon and Syria. During the team's return trip towards their base in Egypt, the team played a match against Corinthians, winning 3–0.
- In late May 1943, a Maccabi team travelled to Beirut and played two matches, winning 2–1 against Lebanese champions Al Nahda FC and 3–2 against a Beirut XI, a team composed of footballers from Al Nahda, Homenetmen and Racing Beirut.
- An Egyptian Army XI, a team composed of players from Al Ahly, Farouk Club and Arsenal Cairo, visited Palestine during June 1943, playing four matches. In their first match, the Egyptians had beaten Maccabi Tel Aviv 2–0, and repeated the result in their second match, against Hapoel Tel Aviv. A third match was played at Rehovot, against a team composed of the best players from Maccabi Rishon LeZion, Maccabi Rehovot and Maccabi Nes Tziona, which the Egyptians won 4–2. The final match of the team was played against an EIFA XI (essentially, the national team), and was won by the Egyptians 3–1.
- On 26 June 1943, Hapoel Haifa had won the Haifa Cup, beating a British Military team 5–3 on aggregate.
