= Ya'akov Grundman =

Israeli footballer

Ya'akov "Yankela" Grundman יעקב "יענקל'ה" גרונדמן
Personal information
- Full name: Ya'akov "Yankeleh" Grundman יעקב גרונדמן
- Date of birth: 20 July 1939
- Place of birth: Proszowice, Poland
- Date of death: 24 May 2004 (aged 64)
- Place of death: Tel Aviv, Israel
- Position: Midfielder

Youth career
- -1954: Bnei Yehuda Tel Aviv

Senior career*
| Years | Team | Apps | (Gls) |
| 1954–1968 | Bnei Yehuda Tel Aviv | 174 | (20) |

International career
| 1961–1964 | Israel | 8 | (0) |

Managerial career
- 1964–1965: Bnei Yehuda Tel Aviv (player-coach)
- 1966–1968: Bnei Yehuda Tel Aviv (player-coach)
- 1970–1971: Bnei Yehuda Tel Aviv
- 1971–1973: Maccabi Petah Tikva
- 1973–1975: Hapoel Haifa
- 1976–1977: Maccabi Tel Aviv
- 1978–1979: Beitar Tel Aviv
- 1979–1981: Maccabi Netanya
- 1981–1982: Maccabi Tel Aviv
- 1982–1983: Hapoel Lod
- 1983–1984: Bnei Yehuda Tel Aviv
- 1986–1988: Shimshon Tel Aviv
- 1988–1992: Israel (co-manager)
- 1992: Hapoel Tel Aviv
- 1995–1997: Bnei Yehuda Tel Aviv
- 1997–1998: Bnei Yehuda Tel Aviv
- * Club domestic league appearances and goals

Ya'akov "Yankela" Grundman (Hebrew: יעקב "יענקל'ה" גרונדמן; 20, Polish: Jakub Grundman, alternatively Jakob Grundman or Ja’akow Grundman; July 1939, Proszowice – 24 May 2004, Tel Aviv) was a Polish-born Ashkenazi Jewish Israeli professional football player and manager.

== Biography ==
=== Early life ===
Grundman was born in Proszowice, Poland before the outbreak of World War II. After the German invasion of Poland, Grundman's family went into hiding with a Polish farmer near the town of Proszowice. Grundman spent three years hiding in the town, many times going weeks at a time before getting something to eat.

At the end of the war, Grundman's father returned to work in the flour business and owned a small bakery. The Grundman's shared profits with the Polish farmer and before making aliyah to Israel, they gave him their business and two houses. Upon arrival to Israel, the family settled in the Hatikva Quarter of Tel Aviv.

=== Playing career ===
Growing up in Hatikva Quarter, Grundman joined the local side, Bnei Yehuda. Being the only Ashkenazi Jew in the squad, Grundman was nicknamed "The Pole." Grundman was part of the squad as they achieved promotion for the first time to the Liga Leumit in 1959.

=== Managerial career ===
After retiring as a player, Grundman began a career as a manager, winning the double with Maccabi Tel Aviv in 1977, as well the Israeli league in 1980 with Maccabi Netanya and the State Cup with Bnei Yehuda Tel Aviv in 1968, and with Hapoel Haifa in 1974. The peak of his managerial career was when ha, alongside Itzhak Schneor had jointly coached Israel between 1988 and 1992, and were one goal short of qualifying for the 1990 world cup.

=== Later life and death ===
Grundman spent years in the hospital fighting cancer. In 2004, IFA chairman, Itche Menahem presented him with the FIFA Order of Merit. Grundman passed the next day. Before the funeral, his coffin was brought to Ramat Gan Stadium so that the public could pay their respects. On 27 March 2004, three days after Grundman's death, the Israel national team held a moment of silence for Yankeleh before their friendly match against Georgia in Tbilisi.

== Honours ==
=== Playing honours ===
==== Club ====
Bnei Yehuda Tel Aviv

- State Cup: 1968

=== Managerial honours ===
==== Club ====
Hapoel Haifa

- State Cup: 1973–74

Maccabi Tel Aviv

- Liga Leumit: 1976–77
- State Cup: 1976–77

Maccabi Netanya

- Liga Leumit: 1979–80

Shimshon Tel Aviv

- Toto Cup (2): 1986–87, 1987–88

==== Individual ====
- FIFA Order of Merit: 2004
