= 1948–49 in Israeli football =

Football in Israel
- Season: 1948–49

The 1948–49 season was the first season of competitive football in Israel, which was established towards the end of the previous season, and the 23rd season under the Israeli Football Association, established in 1928, during the British Mandate.

== IFA Competitions ==
As the newly formed Israel was in the midst of the 1948 Arab–Israeli War, most footballing activities were delayed until spring 1949.

=== 1949–51 Israel State Cup ===
The competition started on 9 April 1949, with 16 teams competing in the first round. After the completion of the quarter-finals, on 28 May 1949, two teams, Maccabi Petah Tikva and Maccabi Tel Aviv appealed their eliminations, and the competition was halted.

=== League competitions ===
League competitions started in May 1949 and carried over to the next season.

=== Youth competitions ===
Footballing activities for underage (and therefore, not eligible for military service) footballers continued, as possible even during the ongoing war, with the 1947–48 Palestine Noar League, which started before the declaration of independence, completed in summer 1948. During fall 1949, the IFA organized a national cup competition for youth teams, which was won by Maccabi Tel Aviv, who had beaten Maccabi Ramat Gan 3–0 in the final.

== National teams ==
=== National team ===
In summer 1948 an initiative was set to send a select XI to a tour in the United States, as a mean to show independence and as a fundraiser for the cash-strapped state. Prior to departure the national team held a training camp in Israel, playing training matches against several army teams, beating the transport corps 10–1, the artillery corps 8–0, the Alexandroni Brigade 8–3 and a select XI from the brigades stationed along the Jordanian-Iraqi front 6–0.

The team played three matches on the tour, one against the USA team which appeared in the 1948 Summer Olympics, and two against select XIs, losing all three matches. While in the US, the teams also had a training match, while visiting the United States Military Academy, against the Army Black Knights, winning 9–0.

==== 1948–49 matches ====
26 September 1948 friendly	United States	3–1	Israel	New York
	Souza 14', 57'; McLaughlin 44'	Summary (in Hebrew)	Ben-Dror 20'	Stadium: Yankee Stadium; Attendance: 35,000
