= 1943–44 Palestine League =

Palestine League
- Season: 1943–44
- Champions: Hapoel Tel Aviv; 5th title

The 1943-44 Palestine League was the tenth season of league football in the British Mandate for Palestine. The defending champions were Maccabi Tel Aviv.

Fourteen clubs took part in the league. the league schedule was inconsistent, as no club completed playing the 26 games.

The championship was won by Hapoel Tel Aviv.

== League table ==
Pos	Team	Pld	W	D	L	GF	GA	GR	Pts
1	Hapoel Tel Aviv	21	17	3	1	76	11	6.909	37
2	Maccabi Rehovot	25	16	5	4	62	36	1.722	37
3	Maccabi Nes Tziona	22	14	3	5	63	31	2.032	31
4	Maccabi Tel Aviv	21	13	2	6	62	27	2.296	28
5	Hapoel Petah Tikva	23	13	1	9	67	32	2.094	27
6	Maccabi Netanya	20	11	5	4	47	38	1.237	27
7	Hapoel Ramat Gan	25	9	7	9	61	55	1.109	25
8	Beitar Tel Aviv	22	11	0	11	48	43	1.116	22
9	Maccabi Rishon LeZion	22	9	1	12	46	48	0.958	19
10	Hapoel Rehovot	21	8	3	10	31	41	0.756	19
11	Hapoel Rishon LeZion	24	6	4	14	39	87	0.448	16
12	Hakoah Tel Aviv	22	5	5	12	25	45	0.556	15
13	Maccabi Petah Tikva	23	5	2	16	32	73	0.438	12
14	Hapoel Herzliya	22	1	1	20	16	100	0.160	3

Source: rsssf.com and The Palestine Post, 29 June 1944, p. 2
