= Maccabi Netanya F.C. =

Association football club in Israel

Maccabi Netanya
- Full name: Maccabi Netanya Football Club
- Nickname: The Diamonds
- Founded: 1934; 92 years ago
- Ground: Netanya Stadium, Netanya
- Capacity: 13,610
- Owner: Aliya Capital Partners
- Chairman: Ross Kestin
- Manager: Ronny Levy
- League: Israeli Premier League
- 2025–26: Israeli Premier League, 7th of 14
- Website: www.fcmn.co.il
| Home colours | Away colours | Third colours |

Maccabi Netanya F.C. (Hebrew: מועדון כדורגל מכבי נתניה, romanized: Moadon kaduregel Maccabi Netanya) is an Israeli professional football club based in Netanya. Established in 1934 in the Palestine League, the club was a founding member of the Israeli League in 1949. After winning their first championship in 1971, the club's golden period lasted until the late 80s, including four more league titles and a double in 1978.

== History ==
A chart showing the progress of Maccabi Netanya through the Israeli football league system, from 1939 to the present

Maccabi Netanya Football Club was founded in 1934 and initially played in green and white stripes. The club played their first game against Beitar Netanya in 1935 at the Maccabi stadium, which was located in the center of the city. The club's first season was in 1935–36 when they played in Liga Gimel which back then was the third tier in Israeli football. After three seasons in Liga Gimel the club won promotion to Liga Bet (second tier), and in the 1941–42 season they won Liga Bet to secure promotion to the top division which back then was known as the Palestine League.

During the early to mid 1940s, a number of British players who served in military bases near Netanya played for the club. The most famous were Bertie Mee and Tom Finney, who were the first foreigners to play for the club. The 1943–44 season of the Palestine League was the first season that Maccabi Netanya played a full season in the top tier of football in the country, they finished the season in the sixth place. During the 1948 Arab–Israeli War, four of the club's players were killed – Israel Arbaitman, Yehuda Blecher, Haim Goldstein, David Liebster and coach Baruch Feuer.

After the establishment of the State of Israel, Maccabi Netanya was among the 13 teams that formed the senior league in Israel. In the 1949–50 season, Netanya finished in ninth place. In 1954 the club qualified for the Israel State Cup for the first time and the next season the club finished in fourth place in the league. After two rather successful seasons, the club had to fight against relegation in the 1955-56 season. Netanya managed to get back in the top of table in the 1957–58 season as they finished fourth again. In the 1961–62 season, after a few years in the bottom of the league, the club got relegated to the second division after finishing 12th and final in the league. Netanya played two seasons in Liga Alef until in the end of the 1963–64 season when they won the league and got promoted back to the top division. With the return of the team to Liga Leumit, the team joined the top ranks, with Mordechai Spiegler playing in its ranks. Spiegler finished three consecutive seasons as the top scorer of the league. In the 1968–69 season, the team finished third in the league with Spiegler again as the top scorer.

After the third-placed finish in 1968–69, the 1970–71 season saw Netanya win their first title by a margin of eleven points, back then the largest in Israeli football history. They also reached the State Cup final, but lost 2–1 to Maccabi Tel Aviv. In 1972–73 Neyanya finished thirteenth in Liga Leumit, avoiding relegation by only two points. However, the following season they won their second title. In 1975 they changed their kit to play in black and yellow. They won a third title in 1977–78, and completed the double by beating Bnei Yehuda 2–1 in the State Cup final. They also finished as winners of their group in the UEFA Intertoto Cup. A fourth championship was won in 1979–80 by a margin of ten points, whilst their fifth title, in 1982–83 was won by a fourteen-point margin. In the same season they won the League Cup, a feat repeated the following year. In 1986–87 and 1988–89 they reached the League Cup final, but lost on both occasions.

In 1994–95 Netanya finished bottom of Liga Leumit and were relegated to Liga Artzit, in the same season the youth team won the youth championship. After winning the league in 1998–99 they returned to the top division. However, they were relegated again in 2003–04 after finishing second from bottom, though they made an immediate return to the top division after finishing as Liga Leumuit runners-up in 2004–05, a season in which they also won the Toto Cup Leumit.

In December 2005 Daniel Jammer, a Jewish German businessman bought the club for a fee of $1,500,000. In 2006–07 the club finished as Premier League runners-up, a feat repeated the following season. In April 2008 Lothar Matthäus was appointed manager. Although the club led the league in the early part of the 2008–09 season, they eventually finished fourth and Matthäus was sacked and replaced by Nati Azaria.

The 2010–11 season saw the club finishing sixth in the top playoff games. The next season Netanya finished in fourth place when they shared the same number of points as the runners-up. This was quite an achievement considering the fact that the club did not have a stable budget behind them or an owner to invest in the club. They were relegated again in 2012–13 after finishing second from bottom.

In August 2013 Eli Segav and Yossi Maor took over as the new owners of the club. Netanya made an immediate return to the top division after finishing as the champions of Liga Leumuit in the 2013–14 season, a season in which they also reached the State Cup final, losing 1–0 to Ironi Kiryat Shmona in front of more than 22,000 supporters of Netanya.

The club got relegated again at the end of the 2015–16 season. This season is regarded as the worst season the club has ever had in the first tier of Israeli football and most have said it was the worst in the history of the club. Doron Osidon was appointed the chairman of the club by the mayor of Netanya. Shlomi Dora was signed as the manager of the club. At the start of the season five players got severely injured (including the main goalscorer and captain Eran Levy) which caused for many problems. Dora got sacked after the club did not do well, Reuven Atar got called to replace him. After three months of no real change and barely winning any points, Atar was sacked as well. Guy Tzarfati was called up to be the caretaker manager and after he lost a State Cup game against Sektzia Nes Tziona of the third division he was sacked and was replaced by Meni Koretski who could not save the sinking ship. Koretski decided to quit on 26 March. Omer Peretz who retired at the start of the season (after he was one of the players that got injured), became the manager of the club.

In June 2016 Eyal Segal (a known die hard supporter of Maccabi Netanya) took over as the new owner of the club and declared the goal is to get promoted at the end of the season. The club started the 2016-17 season with a deduction of 9 points, but still managed to do the unthinkable as they got promoted back to the top flight of Israeli football as the Leumit champions. In the 2018–19 season, the club reached the State Cup final in a replay of the 1978 final against Bnei Yehuda, only this time Netanya lost 4–5 in penalties. 4 years later, Netanya won the Toto Cup and reached the finals of State Cup yet again, only to lose to Beitar Jerusalem.

== Rivalry ==
There is a strong rivalry between Netanya and Beitar Nes Tubruk Netanya. Originally, there were hopes of the two clubs uniting so as not to split allegiances of kids in the city. The merger never came to fruition and since, the two clubs have been at each other's throats both claiming that the other has forced a child not to switch clubs, which is illegal in Israel. On one occasion when two Tubruk players came to shake hands with Netanya players after a derby match in Liga Leumit LeNoar, they were subsequently left out of the team for the club's next league match. The senior derby only took place a handful of times when both clubs played in the second tier, in the 1939 season, 1940 season, 1941–42 season, 1962–63 season and in the 1963–64 season. The 1986–87 season was the only season the two teams played in the top division at the same time. The first game took place in Tubruk Stadium with 9,000 people in attendance, Yigal Menahem scored the only goal for Maccabi. The derby also took place in the State Cup during the 1947 first round and the 1984 seventh round.

There's also a strong rivalry between Netanya and Hapoel Kfar Saba, games between the two are often called "Derby HaSharon" because the two clubs are known to be the major teams from the Sharon plain. The rivalry was at its peak in the 1981–82 season which saw the two clubs going head to head for the championship with Netanya losing the title in the final game of the season.

And there's a rivalry between Netanya and Maccabi Herzliya because both clubs are from the Sharon District and in the 1994/95 season, Maccabi Herzliya defeated Maccabi Netanya and dropped Netanya to the second division.

Since the late 1990s, the strongest rivalry has probably been Hapoel Be'er Sheva.

== Fans ==
The current Maccabi Netanya fan organization is known as "VATOS LOCOS".

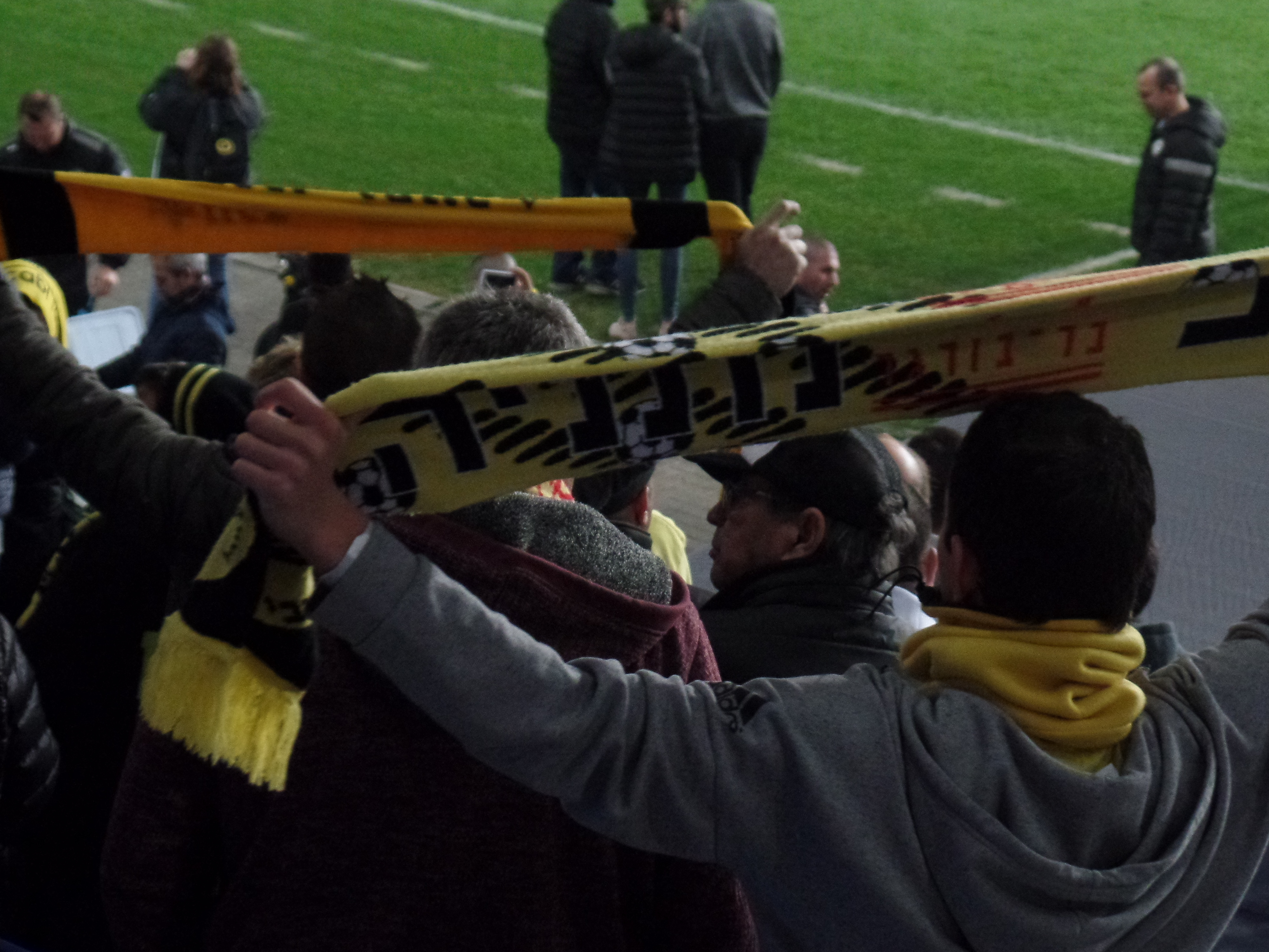
Maccabi Netanya Fans, 2018

== Stadium ==
The club plays its home matches at the 13,610-capacity Netanya Stadium, which was opened in October 2012. The club former stadium was the 7,500-capacity Sar-Tov Stadium, which was commonly known as HaKufsa (lit. The Box). It was named after Yosef Sar-Tov, who was amongst the club's founders, and was its first chairman.

== "The Diamonds" nickname etymology ==
"The Diamonds" nickname origin is in the large diamonds industry that was in the city of Netanya, in the beginning of diamonds industry in Israel in early 1940s. In the 1940s 33 factories started to work in Israel, mostly in Netanya and Tel-Aviv, and Netanya was nicknamed "Diamonds City".

== European Campaigns ==
| Season | Competition | Round | Club | Home | Away | Aggregate |
|---|---|---|---|---|---|---|
| 2007–08 | UEFA Cup | 2nd qualifying round | (Portugal) U.D. Leiria | 0–1 | 0–0 | 0–1 |
| 2008–09 | UEFA Cup | 2nd qualifying round | (Bulgaria) Cherno More Varna | 1–1 | 0–2 | 1–3 |
| 2009–10 | UEFA Europa League | 2nd qualifying round | (Malta) Sliema Wanderers | 0–0 | 3–0 | 3–0 |
| 2009–10 | UEFA Europa League | 3rd qualifying round | (Turkey) Galatasaray | 1–4 | 0–6 | 1–10 |
| 2012–13 | UEFA Europa League | 2nd qualifying round | (Finland) KuPS | 1–2 | 1–0 | 2–2 (a) |
| 2022–23 | UEFA Europa Conference League | 2nd qualifying round | (Turkey) İstanbul Başakşehir | 0–1 | 1–1 | 1–2 |

== Players ==
=== Current squad ===
As of 26 July 2026

| No. | Pos. | Nation | Player |
|---|---|---|---|
| 1 | GK | ISR | Niv Antman |
| 2 | DF | RUS | Grigori Morozov |
| 4 | DF | ISR | Itay Ben Shabat |
| 5 | DF | ISR | Denis Kulikov |
| 6 | DF | MLI | Bakary Konaté |
| 8 | MF | ISR | Dolev Haziza |
| 10 | MF | ISR | Oz Bilu |
| 11 | FW | ISR | Dor Hugi |
| 12 | DF | ISR | Alon Azugi |
| 13 | MF | ISR | Nadav Niddam |
| 14 | MF | ISR | Liam Cohen |
| 15 | MF | ISR | Maor Levi |
| 16 | MF | ISR | Bassam Zarora |
| 17 | FW | ISR | Yarin Abuhatzera |
| 18 | MF | ISR | Omri Shamir |

| No. | Pos. | Nation | Player |
|---|---|---|---|
| 21 | FW | UKR | Oleksiy Talpa |
| 22 | GK | POR | Samu |
| 24 | DF | ISR | Amit Cohen |
| 25 | MF | FRA | Wylan Cyprien |
| 26 | DF | ISR | Karem Jaber (captain) |
| 32 | MF | CIV | Aziz Ouattara |
| 40 | DF | GEO | Saba Khvadagiani |
| 44 | DF | ISR | Benny Feldman |
| 75 | GK | ISR | Daniel Cohen |
| 83 | FW | BRA | Matheus Davó |
| — | FW | ISR | Eylon Almog |
| — | DF | BEN | Olivier Verdon |
| — | FW | BRA | Isaac (on loan from Athletico Paranaense) |
| — | MF | ROU | Gabriel Simion (on loan from Universitatea Cluj) |

=== Out on loan ===
| No. | Pos. | Nation | Player |
|---|---|---|---|
| — | GK | ISR | Omer Nir'on (at Maccabi Haifa until 30 June 2027) |
| — | GK | ISR | Tomer Livitanov (at Bnei Yehuda until 30 June 2027) |
| — | DF | ISR | Jawad Kadah (at Hapoel Ra'anana until 30 June 2027) |

| No. | Pos. | Nation | Player |
|---|---|---|---|
| — | DF | ISR | Fares Agbaria (at F.C. Kiryat Yam until 30 June 2027) |
| — | MF | ISR | Aviv Kanarik (at Hapoel Acre until 30 June 2026) |
| — | FW | ISR | Ori Azulay (at Hapoel Acre until 30 June 2026) |

=== Foreigners 2024–25 ===
Only up to six non-Israeli nationals can be in an Israeli club squad (only five can play at the same time). Those with Jewish ancestry, married to an Israeli or have played in Israel for an extended period of time, can claim a passport or permanent residency which would allow them to play with Israeli status.

- (Cape Verde) Heriberto Tavares
- (Cameroon) Mohammed Djetei
- (United States) Wilson Harris
- (Brazil) Matheus Davó
- (Georgia (country)) Saba Khvadagiani
- (Ivory Coast) Aziz Ouattara
- (Brazil) Luccas Paraizo

=== Former members ===
- Yossi Malka

== Honours ==
=== Domestic ===
==== League ====
- Israeli Premier League
  - Champions (5): 1970–71, 1973–74, 1977–78, 1979–80, 1982–83
  - Runners-up (5): 1974–75, 1981–82, 1987–88, 2006–07, 2007–08
- Liga Leumit
  - Winners (5): 1941–42, 1963–64, 1998–99, 2013–14, 2016–17
  - Runners-up: 2004–05

==== Cups ====
- State Cup
  - Winners (1): 1977–78
  - Runners-up (5): 1953–54, 1969–70, 2013–14, 2018–19, 2022–23
- League Cup
  - Winners (2): 1982, 1983
- Toto Cup
  - Winners (1): 2022–23
  - Runners-up: 1986–87, 1988–89
- Toto Cup Leumit
  - Winners: 2004–05
- Israeli Supercup
  - Winners (5): 1971, 1974, 1978, 1980, 1983

=== Minor honours ===
- Nesher Cup
  - Winners: 1941
- Netanya Cup
  - Winners: 1953

== Records ==
=== Local ===
- First Goal in the Top Division: Yitzhak Casspi, 1948
- Record Win: 12–0 v Hapoel Ramla, 1974
- Record Defeat: 1–10 v Maccabi Petah Tikva, 25.6.1949
- Record home Attendance: 13,800 v Hapoel Tel Aviv in the opening game of the new Netanya Stadium, 4.11.2012
- Most Appearances: Haim Bar with 417
- All Time Scorer: Mordechai Spiegler with 274 goals (in all competitions)
- Most League Goals in a Season: 82, 1966–68
- Most League Goals in a Season by a Player: 38 goals by Mordechai Spiegler, Liga Leumit, 1966–68
- Most Goals in European competitions by a Player: 21 goals by David Lavi (scored in UEFA Intertoto Cup between 1978 and 1984)
- Most Points in a Season: 61 – 30 games, 1982–83
- Longest unbeaten run (League): 28 games, 14 May 2016 to 8 March 2017
- Record signing – $400,000 Ferenc Hamori (1999),Itay Shechter (2006)
- Record sale – €2,000,000 Dia Saba (2018)

=== European ===
- First Appearance in a European Competition: UEFA Intertoto Cup – vs. (Bosnia and Herzegovina) FK Sloboda Tuzla, 24 June 1978
- Biggest Win in a European Competition: UEFA Intertoto Cup – vs. (Sweden) IF Elfsborg (7:1), 1 July 1978
- Biggest Defeat in a European Competition: UEFA Intertoto Cup – vs. (Austria) FC Admira Wacker (0:6), 21 July 1984 & UEFA Europa League – vs. (Turkey) Galatasaray (0:6), 6 August 2009

== Managers ==
- (Germany) Zigrman Vdofrman (1935–36)
- (Mandatory Palestine) Gershon Peskov (1936–37)
- (Mandatory Palestine) Ben Ami Michlis (1937–38)
- (Mandatory Palestine) Armin Weiss (1938–39)
- (Mandatory Palestine) Baruch Feir (1939–40)
- (Mandatory Palestine) **Armin Weiss (1941–42)**
- (Mandatory Palestine) Jerry Beit haLevi (1943–45)
- (Mandatory Palestine) Jacob Feuer (1946–47)
- (Mandatory Palestine) (Israel) Armin Weiss (1949–50)
- (Israel) Jerry Beit haLevi (1951–52)
- (Israel) Gershon Meller (1953–54)
- (Israel) Chibi Brown (1954–56)
- (Israel) Gershon Meller (1956)
- (Israel) George Raygesh (1956)
- (Israel) Yitzhak Casspi (1956–57)
- (Israel) Jerry Beit haLevi (1957–60)
- (Israel) Itzhak Schneor (1960–61)
- (Israel) Joseph Tessler (1961–62)
- (Israel) Yitzhak Casspi (1962–63)
- (Socialist Federal Republic of Yugoslavia) **Milan Bečić (1963–65)**
- (Israel) Otto Schlefenberg (1965–67)
- (Israel) Emmanuel Scheffer (1967)
- (Israel) Itzhak Schneor (1968–70)
- (Israel) **David Schweitzer (1970–71)**
- (Israel) Eli Fuchs (1971–72)
- (Israel) **Arie Radler (1972–74)**
- (Israel) Eliezer Spiegel (1974–75)
- (Israel) **Shmulik Perlman (1975–79)**
- (Israel) **Ya'akov Grundman (1979–81)**
- (Israel) Shmulik Perlman (1981–82)
- (Israel) **Mordechai Spiegler (1982–84)**
- (Israel) Shmulik Perlman (1984–85)
- (Israel) Ze'ev Seltzer (1985–88)
- (Israel) Yehoshua Feigenbaum (1988–90)
- (Israel) Mordechai Spiegler (1990–92)
- (Israel) Shmulik Perlman (1992–94)
- (Israel) Vico Haddad (1994–95)
- (Israel) Shmulik Perlman (1995)
- (Israel) Albert Gazal and Benyamin Lam (1995–96)
- (Israel) Gideon Cohen (1996–98)
- (Israel) Asher Messing (1998)
- (Israel) **Uri Malmilian (1998–99)**
- (Israel) Motti Ivanir (1999)
- (Israel) Uri Malmilian (1999–00)
- (Israel) Rami Levy (2000)
- (Israel) Uri Malmilian (2001–02)
- (Israel) Gidi Damti (2002)
- (Israel) Gili Landau (2002–04)
- (Israel) Eli Cohen (2004)
- (Israel) **Reuven Atar (2004–06)**
- (Israel) Eli Guttman (2006–07)
- (Israel) Reuven Atar (2007–08)
- (Germany) Lothar Matthäus (2008–09)
- (Israel) Nati Azaria (2009)
- (Israel) Reuven Atar (2009–12)
- (Israel) Tal Banin (2012–13)
- (Israel) Reuven Atar (2013)
- (Israel) **Yossi Mizrahi (2013–15)**
- (Israel) Ronny Levy (2015)
- (Israel) Shlomi Dora (2015)
- (Israel) Reuven Atar (2015–16)
- (Israel) Meni Koretski (2016)
- (Israel) **Slobodan Drapić (2016–2020)**
- (Netherlands) Raymond Atteveld (2020–2021)
- (Israel) Benyamin Lam (2021–2022)
- (Israel) **Ran Kojok (2022–2023)**
- (Israel) Guy Tzarfati (2023–2024)
- (Israel) Marco Balbul (2024–)
- Managers marked in **bold** have won an honour with the club.
