= Rami Levy (footballer) =

Israeli footballer and manager

Rami Levy רמי לוי
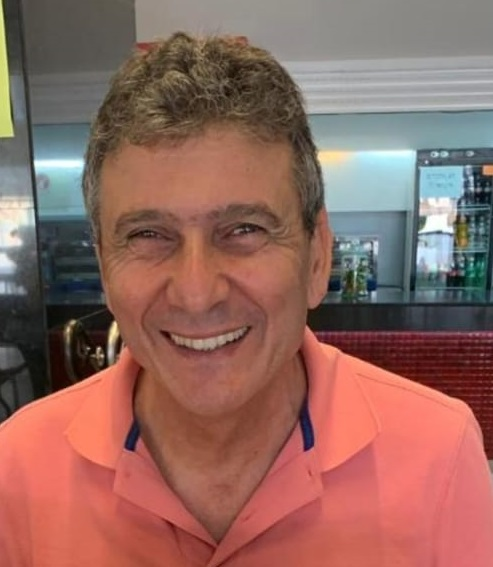

Personal information
- Full name: Rami Levy
- Date of birth: March 9, 1958 (age 68)
- Place of birth: Israel

Youth career
- Bnei Yehuda

Senior career*
Years	Team	Apps	(Gls)
- Bnei Yehuda

Managerial career
- 1989–1994: Bnei Yehuda
- 1994–1995: Hapoel Tzafririm Holon
- 1995–1996: Bnei Yehuda
- 1996–1998: Maccabi Ironi Ashdod
- 1998–1999: Bnei Yehuda
- 1999–2000: Maccabi Netanya
- 2000–2001: Ironi Rishon LeZion
- 2001–2002: Bnei Yehuda
- 2002: Hapoel Tzafririm Holon
- 2003–2004: Hapoel Ashkelon
- 2006: Hapoel Bnei Lod
- 2008–2009: Maccabi Herzliya
- 2009–: Bnei Yehuda (Youth)
- * Club domestic league appearances and goals

Rami Levy (Hebrew: רמי לוי; born 9 March 1958) is an Israeli football manager and a former player for Bnei Yehuda Tel Aviv F.C. He has managed Bnei Yehuda F.C. since 2009.
