= Shlomo Scharf =

Israeli football coach and pundit

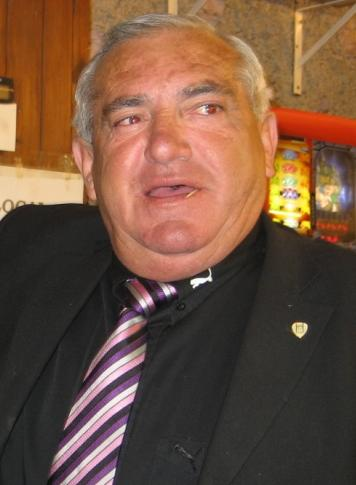

Personal information
- Date of birth: 1 January 1943 (age 83)
- Place of birth: Biysk, Altai Krai, USSR

Youth career
- Hapoel Kfar Saba

Senior career*
Years	Team	Apps	(Gls)
1961–1973	Hapoel Kfar Saba		

Managerial career
- 1974–1976: Hapoel Kfar Saba
- 1976–1978: Hapoel Yehud
- 1978–1980: Hapoel Kfar Saba
- 1980–1983: Bnei Yehuda
- 1983–1987: Maccabi Haifa
- 1990–1992: Maccabi Haifa
- 1992–1999: Israel
- 2000: Maccabi Tel Aviv
- 2000: Hapoel Be'er Sheva
- * Club domestic league appearances and goals

Shlomo Scharf (Hebrew: שלמה שרף; born 1 January 1943) is an Israeli former football coach and player who works as a commentator on Israeli Sport 5 TV channel. Scharf managed Maccabi Haifa to three championships, and was Israel national team manager from 1992 to 1999.

== Early life ==
Scharf was born in Biysk, Siberia in the Soviet Union (now part of Russia) to a Holocaust survivor family of Polish origin that was exiled there during World War II. He immigrated to Israel in 1949 and after spending a year in an immigrant camp in Pardes Hanna, moved to veteran housing in Kfar Saba.

He began playing football for Hapoel Kfar Saba, and between 1961 and 1974 he coached the youth department of Hapoel Kfar Saba, while also being an active player for the club.

== Coaching career ==
=== Hapoel Kfar Saba ===
In 1974 Scharf was appointed coach of Hapoel Kfar Saba's senior team, which he led to its first State Cup win in 1975. After that he coached Hapoel Yehud for two years, and when he returned to Hapoel Kfar Saba he won another State Cup with it in 1980. He then began coaching Bnei Yehuda Tel Aviv, with which he won the State Cup in 1981.

=== Maccabi Haifa ===
His big breakthrough came when he started coaching Maccabi Haifa in 1983, until then a team without ambition whose main goal was to play attacking and entertaining football. Scharf instilled a winning mentality in Haifa's talented squad and built an attacking team based on four forwards, including Ronny Rosenthal and Zahi Armeli. At the end of the 1983–84 season, Maccabi Haifa won its first ever championship. The following year, under his guidance, the team won a second championship.

In 1990 Scharf returned to coach Maccabi Haifa and won the double with them in the 1990–91 season. In addition to the double, Scharf built an excellent midfield spearheaded by Reuven Atar and two young talents: Eyal Berkovic and Tal Banin. Despite the publicized disputes between Scharf and the young Berkovic, the two later became friends, and Berkovic went on to become one of Scharf's biggest supporters.

=== Israel national team ===
Following his success with Maccabi Haifa, Scharf was appointed coach of the Israel national team, leading it from 1992 to 2000. During his tenure, the national team improved its performances in Europe but failed to qualify for any tournaments.

His main achievements with the national team were 3–2 victory over France national team in 1993 at the Parc des Princes and a 5–0 victory over Austria national team in 1999 at the Ramat Gan Stadium. In his final year as coach, the national team reached the play-off stage of UEFA Euro 2000 qualifying, its best achievement since beginning to compete in Europe in the early 1990s. However, in the play-offs, Israel lost to Denmark national team5–0 and 3–0, and Scharf was replaced by Danish coach Richard Møller Nielsen.

In Saul Eisenberg's book "Sodom and Gomorrah", the author accused Scharf of being the one who ordered escort girls to his room the night before the match against Denmark, in what later became known to the public in Israel as the "Escort Girls Affair".

=== After the national team ===
After leaving the national team, Scharf was appointed coach of Maccabi Tel Aviv for the 2000–01 season but was fired after just two league games due to a dispute with the team's star Avi Nimni. After leaving the club, Scharf was appointed coach of Hapoel Be'er Sheva, then playing in the second division, but resigned after just one game due to disagreements with the club's management.

In 2015 Scharf appeared on reality TV show MasterChef VIP.

In 2023, Scharf's granddaughter, May Naim, was murdered during the Nova music festival massacre.

== Punditry ==
Since his retirement from managing Scharf works as a pundit on Israeli football for local media and national television. In November 2020, he was suspended by Sports Channel for saying the black Panamian footballer Abdiel Arroyo "should go home and eat bananas" after missing a shot.

This comment was notably criticized by Culture and Sports Minister Hili Tropper, who said "racism must be directly addressed. Shlomo Sharaf’s statement is inappropriate and has no place in Israeli sports or society in general."

Scharf in turn denied his comment was racist, saying "This isn’t racism. I said he should go home to eat bananas. If I sent you home to eat cholent, is that racism?"

Scharf returned to the channel in early 2021.

== Honours ==
=== As a player ===
- Israeli Second Division: 1966–68; runner-up 1965–66

=== As a manager ===
- Israeli Premier League: 1983–84, 1984–85, 1990–91; runner-up 1980–81, 1985–86
- Israel State Cup: 1975, 1980, 1981, 1991; runner-up 1985, 1987
- Israeli Supercup: 1985
- UEFA Intertoto Cup: 1985
