= 1981–82 Liga Leumit =

Liga Leumit
- Season: 1981–82
- Champions: Hapoel Kfar Saba; 1st title
- Relegated: Hapoel Rishon LeZion; Beitar Tel Aviv; Hapoel Petah Tikva
- Top goalscorer: Oded Machnes (26)

The 1981–82 Liga Leumit season saw Hapoel Kfar Saba win their first, and to date only title. Oded Machnes of runners-up Maccabi Netanya was the league's top scorer with 26 goals. Hapoel Rishon LeZion, Beitar Tel Aviv and Hapoel Petah Tikva were all relegated.

== Final table ==
Pos	Team	Pld	W	D	L	GF	GA	GD	Pts	Qualification or relegation
1	Hapoel Kfar Saba (C)	30	17	8	5	45	28	+17	42	Qualification for the Intertoto Cup
2	Maccabi Netanya	30	17	7	6	63	29	+34	41	
3	Bnei Yehuda	30	13	9	8	34	30	+4	35	
4	Hapoel Be'er Sheva	30	14	6	10	43	38	+5	34	
5	Hapoel Tel Aviv	30	9	13	8	32	25	+7	31	Qualification for the Intertoto Cup
6	Beitar Jerusalem	30	9	12	9	37	36	+1	30	
7	Maccabi Haifa	30	9	12	9	32	32	0	30	
8	Maccabi Tel Aviv	30	10	10	10	26	32	−6	30	
9	Maccabi Petah Tikva	30	9	11	10	35	35	0	29	
10	Hapoel Jerusalem	30	8	13	9	24	26	−2	29	
11	Maccabi Jaffa	30	9	11	10	32	36	−4	29	
12	Shimshon Tel Aviv	30	7	14	9	25	32	−7	28	
13	Hapoel Yehud	30	6	16	8	17	26	−9	28	
14	Hapoel Rishon LeZion (R)	30	8	10	12	28	32	−4	26	Relegated to Liga Artzit
15	Beitar Tel Aviv (R)	30	5	14	11	22	32	−10	24	Relegated to Liga Artzit
16	Hapoel Petah Tikva (R)	30	3	8	19	13	39	−26	14	Relegated to Liga Artzit

Source: rsssf.com
(C) Champions; (R) Relegated

== Results ==
Home \ Away	BEI	BTA	BnY	HBS	HJE	HKS	HPT	HRL	HTA	HYE	MHA	MJA	MNE	MPT	MTA	STA
Beitar Jerusalem	—	1–0	2–2	0–2	0–0	4–1	2–0	0–0	1–1	2–0	3–1	1–1	1–0	2–1	1–2	4–0
Beitar Tel Aviv	1–1	—	0–0	1–1	0–0	1–3	1–0	2–0	0–2	0–2	0–0	1–0	0–1	1–1	2–2	0–0
Bnei Yehuda	3–3	2–0	—	3–1	3–1	1–2	1–0	3–1	0–2	1–3	0–0	0–0	1–0	1–0	1–0	0–0
Hapoel Be'er Sheva	0–2	1–2	1–2	—	2–1	3–1	2–0	2–1	1–3	2–0	2–0	3–1	2–2	1–0	2–0	1–1
Hapoel Jerusalem	2–1	1–1	0–1	1–0	—	2–0	1–0	1–0	0–0	0–0	0–0	1–1	1–1	0–1	1–2	1–0
Hapoel Kfar Saba	1–0	1–1	2–0	3–1	1–0	—	1–0	4–0	1–0	3–0	1–0	2–1	2–1	0–0	2–1	4–0
Hapoel Petah Tikva	0–0	0–0	0–0	0–2	0–1	1–2	—	0–0	1–1	0–0	3–2	2–1	1–1	0–1	1–1	1–2
Hapoel Rishon LeZion	2–0	0–0	0–2	1–1	3–0	2–1	4–0	—	1–1	0–0	1–1	2–0	1–2	2–2	0–1	1–1
Hapoel Tel Aviv	1–1	1–3	1–2	4–0	2–1	0–0	0–1	1–0	—	0–0	1–1	1–2	0–0	1–1	1–0	2–1
Hapoel Yehud	0–0	0–0	1–0	0–2	1–1	0–0	1–0	1–0	1–1	—	1–1	0–1	0–0	1–0	0–0	1–1
Maccabi Haifa	3–1	3–1	3–1	0–2	1–0	1–1	1–0	0–1	1–0	0–0	—	2–1	2–2	0–0	2–0	1–2
Maccabi Jaffa	2–1	1–0	2–2	3–1	0–0	1–1	1–0	1–2	1–3	0–0	1–1	—	2–0	2–0	0–3	2–2
Maccabi Netanya	6–1	3–1	3–0	2–0	2–2	5–2	3–0	4–1	2–1	4–2	2–0	1–2	—	4–1	6–0	1–0
Maccabi Petah Tikva	4–2	1–1	0–2	0–0	2–2	1–1	3–1	0–2	2–1	5–1	3–2	1–1	3–1	—	0–0	0–1
Maccabi Tel Aviv	0–0	3–2	0–0	2–2	0–2	1–2	2–0	1–0	0–0	1–0	0–0	2–0	0–2	2–1	—	0–0
Shimshon Tel Aviv	0–0	1–0	2–0	2–3	1–1	0–0	2–1	0–0	0–0	1–1	2–3	1–1	0–2	0–1	2–0	—

Legend: Blue = home team win; Yellow = draw; Red = away team win.
