= Hapoel Kfar Saba F.C. =

Israeli association football club

Hapoel Kfar Saba
- Full name: Hapoel Kfar Saba Football Club
- Nickname: The Greens from the Sharon
- Founded: 1928; 98 years ago
- Ground: Levita Stadium, Kfar Saba, Israel
- Capacity: 5,800
- Owner: Itzhak Shum
- Manager: Shahar Weiseinger
- League: Liga Leumit
- 2025–26: Liga Leumit, 7th of 16
- Website: www.hapoel-kfs.org.il
Home colours	Away colours	Third colours

Hapoel Kfar Saba F.C. (Hebrew: מועדון כדורגל הפועל כפר סבא, Moadon Kaduregel Hapoel Kfar Saba) is an Israeli football club based in Kfar Saba. The club competes in the Liga Leumit and plays home matches at Levita Stadium.

== History ==
A chart showing the progress of Hapoel Kfar Saba through the Israeli football league system, from 1946–47 to the present

The club was established in 1928. In 1951–52 they won the South Division of Liga Bet to win promotion to Liga Alef (then the top division). Three years later they finished third from bottom and had to take part in promotion/relegation play-offs with the two top clubs from the second tier. They were unbeatnd during the play-offs and retained their place in Liga Leumit (which had replaced Liga Alef as the top division). However, in 1955–56, they finished bottom and were relegated.

Hapoel made an immediate return to Liga Leumit. They finished bottom in 1957–58, but avoided the drop as no clubs were relegated. However, they finished bottom again the following season and were relegated. The club returned to Liga Leumit in 1968. In 1975, they reached the State Cup final for the first time, beating Beitar Jerusalem 1–0. After several mid-table finishes, they were relegated at the end of the 1976–77 season. They made an immediate return to the top division, finishing third in Liga Artzit (the new second tier). In 1980, they reached the State Cup final again, beating Maccabi Ramat Amidar 4–1.

In 1980–81 they narrowly avoided relegation, finishing two points and one place above the relegation zone. The following season the club won the title for the first (and only) time under the management of Dror Kashtan. However, they finished bottom the season after, and returned to Liga Artzit.

They finished as runners-up to Hapoel Haifa in 1983–84 to make another immediate return to Liga Leumit. In 1990, the club reached the State Cup final for a third time, beating Shimshon Tel Aviv 1–0 after extra time. The following season they were relegated again after finishing bottom of the table. In 1992, under the management of Avram Marchinsky, the club signed its first American player, Michael Winograd, out of Lafayette College. The club returned to the top division the following season.

In 1999–2000 they were relegated to Liga Leumit (now the second tier). They won the league in 2001–02 to return to the top division, but were relegated at the end of the following season. The club won Liga Leumit again in 2004–05, and avoided relegation on goal difference the following season. However, two seasons later they were relegated on goal difference.

For the 2010–11 season, a new owner, Harel Raihman, came on after almost 15 years of Eli Tabib's era. At the end of the regular season, the club finished on top of the league, with an advantage of thirteen points over the third place. However, in the Top playoff, where all the points obtained during the regular season were halved (and rounded up), the club failed to record a win, and finished the league in the third place, behind Ironi Nir Ramat HaSharon and Hapoel Rishon LeZion which were promoted. As the third placed club, Kfar Saba went to play in the Promotion play-off against the 14th-placed club in the Israeli Premier League, Hapoel Petah Tikva, and lost both games, 1-4 and 0–1. Thus, the club remained in Liga Leumit.

In the 2012–13 season the club have entered administration, and as a result, were deducted nine points. The club finished bottom and relegated to Liga Alef, the third tier of Israeli football. With a new owner, Stav Shaham, together with former club captain, Eli Yani, and the supporters trust, "The Green Heart", the club recovered in the following season, and made an immediate return to Liga Leumit, after finishing on top of Liga Alef North division. In the following season, the club made their second successive promotion, following runners-up finish in Liga Leumit. Thus, the club returned to the Israeli Premier League after seven years.

In 2015–16 season, the team finished at 10th, but one season after (2016–17), the team finished 13th and relegated to the Liga Leumit.

== Players ==
=== Current squad ===
As of 4 April 2026

No.	Pos.	Nation	Player
1	GK	ISR	Benjamin Macini
2	DF	ISR	Eliran Zadok
4	DF	ISR	Adir Waheb (on loan from Maccabi Haifa)
5	DF	GHA	Konadu Yiadom
6	MF	ISR	Yishay Brosh
7	FW	ISR	Or Roizman (on loan from Maccabi Tel Aviv)
8	MF	ISR	Adi Tzur (on loan from Maccabi Haifa)
9	FW	CIV	Clovis Yao
10	MF	ISR	Roy Harel
11	FW	ISR	Roy Buganim
14	MF	ISR	Yuval Ben Hemo (on loan from Maccabi Haifa)
15	MF	CIV	Gilbert Bandama
16	MF	ISR	Ofek Peretz

No.	Pos.	Nation	Player
17	MF	ISR	Daniel Darzi (on loan from Maccabi Haifa)
18	MF	ISR	Sarel Cohen (on loan from Maccabi Haifa)
19	FW	ISR	Lion Caro
22	GK	ISR	Shahar Mark
23	GK	ISR	Niv Fliter
31	MF	ISR	Amit Arazi (on loan from Maccabi Haifa)
44	DF	ISR	Hadar Fuchs (on loan from Maccabi Petah Tikva)
47	MF	ISR	Ravid Olitsky (on loan from Hapoel Tel Aviv)
64	GK	ISR	Yanir Nimni
77	FW	ISR	Niv Vaknin (on loan from Hapoel Be'er Sheva)
—	MF	ISR	Liad Shmueli

=== Out on loan ===
No.	Pos.	Nation	Player
—	DF	ISR	Shon Krendi (at Maccabi Sha'arayim until 30 June 2022)
—	FW	ISR	Yahav Afriat (at F.C. Tira until 30 June 2022)

=== Foreigners 2023–24 ===
Only up to six non-Israeli nationals can be in an Israeli club squad (only five can play at the same time). Those with Jewish ancestry, married to an Israeli or have played in Israel for an extended period of time, can claim a passport or permanent residency which would allow them to play with Israeli status.

- (Brazil) Julio César

=== Former players ===
- (Poland) Jerzy Wijas
- Shmuel Kozokin (born 1987), Israeli footballer

== Staff ==
Position	Staff
Owner	(Israel) Itzhak Shum (Israel) The supporters trust "Halev Hayarok" ("The green heart")
CEO	(Israel) Idan Shum
Board Member	(Israel) Sharon Shum
Head coach	(Israel) Ravid Gazal
Goalkeeping coach	(Israel) Tvrtko Kale
Technical manager	(Israel) Reuven Avital
Fitness coach	(Israel) Ran Goldig
Physio	(Israel) Dafna Cohen
Club doctor	(Israel) Dr. Jonathan Koch
Logistics	(Israel) Jacob Serolovich
Manager Youth Department	(Israel) Amnon Raz

== Honours ==
=== League ===
Honour	No.	Years
Israeli Championships	1	1981–82
Second tier	5	1951–52, 1956–57, 1966–68, 2001–02, 2004–05
Third tier	1	2013–14

=== Cup competitions ===
Honour	No.	Years
State Cup	3	1974–75, 1979–80, 1989–90
Super Cup	1	1982

== Managers ==
- (Israel) Haim Reich (1951–54)
- (Israel) Edmond Schmilovich (1954–55)
- (Israel) Emmanuel Scheffer (1955)
- (Israel) Moshe Poliakov (1955–56)
- Israel Weiss (1956–57)
- (Israel) Zvi Erlich (1957–58)
- (Israel) Yair Levita (1958–59)
- (Israel) Eliezer Spiegel (1959)
- (Israel) Yair Levita (1959)
- (Israel) Eliezer Spiegel (1959)
- (Israel) Emmanuel Scheffer (1959)
- (Israel) Yair Levita (1959–60)
- (United Kingdom) Harry Gibbons (1960)
- (Israel) Moshe Varon (1960–61)
- (Israel) Edmond Schmilovich (1961–62)
- (Israel) Yair Levita (1962)
- (Israel) Arie Koch (1962–63)
- (Israel) Lonia Dvorin (1963)
- (Israel) Gershon Meller (1963–64)
- (Israel) Arie Koch (1964–65)
- (Israel) Arie Radler (1965–68)
- (Israel) Ya'akov Grundman (1968–70)
- (Israel) Rehavia Rosenbaum (1970–72)
- (Israel) Nahum Stelmach (1972–73)
- (Israel) Shlomo Scharf (1973–76)
- (Israel) Arie Radler (1976)
- (Israel) Dror Kashtan (1976–77)
- (Israel) Amnon Raz (1977–78)
- (Israel) Shlomo Scharf (1978–80)
- (Israel) Avraham Marchinski (1980–81)
- (Israel) Dror Kashtan (1981–83)
- (Israel) Itzhak Shum (1983–85)
- (Israel) Nissim Bachar (1985–87)
- (Israel) Shimon Shenhar(1987–88)
- (Israel) Avraham Marchinski (1988–89)
- (Poland) Wojciech Łazarek (1989–90)
- (Israel) Asher Messing (1990–91)
- (Israel) Avraham Marchinski (1991–93)
- (Israel) Adir Shamir (1994)
- (Israel) Nissim Bachar (1994)
- (Israel) Eli Yani (1994–95)
- (Israel) Avi Cohen (1996–98)
- (Israel) Shimon Shenhar (1998)
- (Israel) Moshe Sinai (1998–99)
- (Israel) Eyal Lahman (1999)
- (Israel) Avi Cohen (1999–2000)
- (Israel) Elisha Levy (2000)
- (Israel) Motti Ivanir (2000–01)
- (Israel) Uri Elkabetz (2001)
- (Israel) Meir Ben Shimon (2001)
- (Israel) Itzhak Shum (2001–02)
- (Israel) Tamir Ben Haim (2002–03)
- (Israel) Michael Kadosh (2003–04)
- (Israel) Elisha Levy (2004–06)
- (Israel) Eli Ohana (2006–08)
- (Serbia) (Israel) Slobodan Drapić (2008–09)
- (Israel) Tomer Kashtan (2009–11)
- (Israel) Guy Azouri (2011)
- (Israel) Moshe Hershko (2011–12)
- (Israel) Asi Domb (2012)
- (Israel) Alon Mizrahi (2012)
- (Israel) Ran Goldig (2013)
- (Israel) Idan Shum & Tamir Ben Haim (2013)
- (Israel) Yehoshua Feigenbaum (2013)
- (Israel) Felix Naim (2013–15)
- (Israel) Sharon Mimer (2016–2017)
- (Israel) Eli Cohen (2017)
- (Israel) Felix Naim (2017)
- (Israel) Messay Dego (2017–2018)
- (Lithuania) Raimondas Žutautas (2018)
- (Israel) Haim Shabo (2018)
- (Israel) Erez Benodis (2018–2019)
- (Israel) Ofir Haim (2019–2020)
- (Israel) Amir Turgeman (2020–)

== See also ==
- Sports in Israel
