= 2016–17 Israel Youth State Cup =

Tournament details
- Country: Israel

Final positions
- Champions: Hapoel Ra'anana
- Runners-up: Hapoel Rishon LeZion

Tournament statistics
- Matches played: 132
- Goals scored: 563 (4.27 per match)

The 2016–17 Israel Youth State Cup (Hebrew: גביע המדינה, Gvia HaMedina LeNoar) was the 62nd season of Israel's nationwide football cup competition.

The competition was won by Hapoel Ra'anana, who had beaten Hapoel Rishon LeZion 1–0 in the final.

== Results ==
=== First round ===
Matches were played between 20 and 25 September 2016, with a single match delayed until 7 December 2016.

Home team	Score	Away team
Ironi Beit Dagan	2–11	Sektzia Nes Tziona
Bnei Eilat	5–0	F.C. Dimona
Hapoel Herzliya	2–1	Hapoel Kafr Qasim Shouaa
Maccabi Ein Mahil	3–0	Beitar Kafr Kanna
Hapoel Beit She'an Mesilot	1–4	Ironi Tiberias
Bnei Ra'anana	2–8	Beitar Kfar Saba
Otzma Holon	11–0	Elitzur Jaffa Tel Aviv
Ironi Kiryat Gat	3–0	Maccabi Ironi Sderot
Hapoel Oranit	1–14	Hapoel Petah Tikva
Hapoel Katamon Jerusalem	1–0	Ironi Beit Shemesh
F.C. Hatzor HaGlilit	4–1	Bnei HaGolan VeHaGalil
Tzeirei Shefa'-Amr	0–16	F.C. Julis
Hapoel Ironi Bnei I'billin	3–0	Maccabi Tzur Shalom
Maccabi Herzliya	5–0	Hapoel Hod HaSharon
Maccabi Nahariya	3–1	F.C. Kiryat Yam
Hapoel Mahane Yehuda	0–2	Maccbi Kabilio Jaffa
F.C. Ironi Or Yehuda	5–1	Tzeirei Lod
Hapoel Kfar Saba	12–0	Maccabi Ironi Kfar Yona
F.C. Bnei Jaffa Ortodoxim	2–0	Hakoah Amidar Ramat Gan
Hapoel Acre	4–1	Maccabi Ironi Kiryat Ata
Beitar Jerusalem F.C.	4–1	Ironi Modi'in
Maccabi Ironi Bat Yam	4–0	Hapoel Kfar Shalem
Maccabi Amishav Petah Tikva	0–2	F.C. Kafr Qasim
Beitar Haifa	1–0 (a.e.t.)	Maccabi Neve Sha'ana
Hapoel Ramat Gan	9–0	Shikun Vatikim Ramat Gan
Hapoel Hadera	4–1	Hapoel Jaljulia
Hapoel Daliyat al-Karmel	1–3	F.C. Nesher
Hapoel Bnei Lod	9–0	Hapoel Nahlat Yehuda
Beitar Tel Aviv Ramla	2–1	Beitar Ramat Gan
Hapoel Asi Gilboa	3–1	Hapoel Umm al-Fahm
Shimshon Tel Aviv	0–0 (a.e.t.) (4–5 p)	Hapoel Azor
Hapoel Jerusalem	8–0	Hapoel Bnei Ashdod
Hapoel Kiryat Ono	1–2	Maccabi Shoham
Hapoel Mateh Asher	10–1	Beitar Nahariya
Hapoel Rahat	1–5	Maccabi Be'er Sheva
Maccabi Ashdod	0–4	Maccabi Yavne
Ihud Bnei Baqa	1–0	F.C. Pardes Hanna-Karkur
Hapoel Kafr Kanna	2–7	Maccabi Ahi Nazareth
Hapoel Pardesiya	1–3	Ihud Bnei Kafr Qara
Hapoel Bnei Maghar	4–0	Maccabi Sektzia Ma'alot-Tarshiha
Hapoel Afula	2–0	Hapoel Bnei Musmus
Hapoel Ihud Bnei Jatt	0–2	Hapoel Ironi Baqa al-Gharbiyye
Hapoel Migdal HaEmek	1–0	Tzeirei Tur'an
Maccabi Kiryat Malakhi	0–4	A.S. Ashdod
Maccabi Emek Hefer	2–1	Bnei Qalansawe
F.C. Neve Yosef	4–1	Hapoel Yokneam
Hapoel Bu'eine	6–2	Hapoel al-Ittihad Nazareth
F.C. Tira	2–9	Tzeirei Tayibe
Tzeirei Kafr Kanna	2–1	F.C. Bu'eine Nujeidat
Maccabi Bnei Nahf	0–3	Ahva Kafr Manda
Hapoel Ihud Bnei Sumei	0–3	Hapoel Bnei Bi'ina
Maccabi Ironi Barta'a	0–3	Hapoel Nazareth Illit/Emek Izrael
Hapoel Tzafririm Holon	1–3	F.C. Shikun HaMizrah
Hapoel Bnei Tuba-Zangariyye	2–4	Hapoel Nahf
Maccabi Sha'arayim	0–0 (a.e.t.) (4–3 p)	A.S. Ramat Eliyahu
Hapoel Shefa-'Amr	3–0	Ironi Bnei Kabul
Maccabi Ironi Netivot	2–0	Sha'ar HaNegev Regional Council
F.C. Netanya	2–3	Hapoel Ma'agan Michael

=== Second round ===
Most matches were played on 3 December 2016, with six matches delayed and completed until 3 January 2017.

Home team	Score	Away team
Tzeirei Kafr Kanna	2–4	Hapoel Shefa-'Amr
Maccabi Ahi Nazareth	3–1	Hapoel Migdal HaEmek
Hapoel Bnei Lod	3–0	Hapoel Azor
Beitar Haifa	0–1	Hapoel Nahf
Sektzia Nes Tziona	6–3	F.C. Ironi Or Yehuda
Gadna Tel Aviv Yehuda	5–0	F.C. Bnei Jaffa Ortodoxim
Hapoel Afula	2–1 (a.e.t.)	Hapoel Asi Gilboa
Maccabi Herzliya	1–0	Hapoel Hadera
Maccabi Shoham	1–0	Hapoel Katamon Jerusalem
Hapoel Jerusalem	0–5	Hapoel Petah Tikva
Beitar Jerusalem F.C.	0–0 (a.e.t.) (4–3 p)	Maccabi Yavne
Maccabi Ironi Netivot	2–4	Maccabi Be'er Sheva
Ihud Bnei Kafr Qara	4–3	Beitar Kfar Saba
Beitar Tel Aviv Ramla	1–1 (a.e.t.) (-1–1 p)	Hapoel Ramat Gan
Bnei Eilat	2–1	Ironi Kiryat Gat
Maccabi Emek Hefer	2–5	Hapoel Ironi Baqa al-Gharbiyye
Ahva Kafr Manda	1–7	Hapoel Acre
Tzeirei Tayibe	1–2 (a.e.t.)	Ihud Bnei Baqa
Maccbi Kabilio Jaffa	1–1 (a.e.t.) (2–4 p)	F.C. Kafr Qasim
Hapoel Nazareth Illit/Emek Izrael	2–1	Ironi Tiberias
Hapoel Bu'eine	0–3	Maccabi Ein Mahil
Hapoel Ironi Bnei I'billin	3–2	Maccabi Nahariya
A.S. Ashdod	0–0 (a.e.t.) (0–0 p)	Maccabi Sha'arayim
Hapoel Bnei Maghar	3–5	F.C. Hatzor HaGlilit
F.C. Shikun HaMizrah	0–5	Maccabi Ironi Bat Yam
Hapoel Bnei Bi'ina	1–2	F.C. Nesher
Hapoel Herzliya	0–1	Hapoel Ma'agan Michael

=== Third round ===
The 16 matches were played between 24 December 2016 and 14 January 2017.

Home team	Score	Away team
Hapoel Petah Tikva	7–3	Gadna Tel Aviv Yehuda
F.C. Kafr Qasim	0–1	Hapoel Kfar Saba
Ihud Bnei Baqa	2–1 (a.e.t.)	Ihud Bnei Kafr Qara
Hapoel Afula	5–0	Hapoel Ironi Baqa al-Gharbiyye
Maccabi Be'er Sheva	4–1	Bnei Eilat
Maccabi Ironi Bat Yam	0–0 (a.e.t.) (4–2 p)	Hapoel Bnei Lod
Otzma Holon	1–1 (a.e.t.) (6–5 p)	Beitar Tel Aviv Ramla
Hapoel Ironi Bnei I'billin	3–2	F.C. Neve Yosef
F.C. Julis	1–4	Maccabi Ahi Nazareth
Maccabi Ein Mahil	2–2 (a.e.t.) (4–5 p)	Hapoel Nazareth Illit/Emek Izrael
Hapoel Shefa-'Amr	0–3	F.C. Nesher
Sektzia Nes Tziona	1–2	Maccabi Sha'arayim
Maccabi Shoham	0–2	Beitar Jerusalem F.C.
Hapoel Nahf	4–3 (a.e.t.)	F.C. Hatzor HaGlilit
Maccabi Herzliya	9–0	Hapoel Ma'agan Michael
Hapoel Acre	8–1	Hapoel Mateh Asher

=== Fourth round ===
The 16 Premier League clubs joined the competition. Matches were played between 1 and 5 February 2017.

Home team	Score	Away team
Hapoel Be'er Sheva	4–0	Maccabi Sha'arayim
Maccabi Haifa	2–0	Hapoel Ashkelon
Hapoel Nazareth Illit/Emek Izrael	4–1	Otzma Holon
Hapoel Kfar Saba	0–3	Bnei Yehuda
Hapoel Ra'anana	1–0	Hapoel Haifa
F.C. Ironi Ashdod	3–1	Hapoel Acre
Maccabi Be'er Sheva	3–1 (a.e.t.)	Maccabi Ironi Bat Yam
Hapoel Afula	1–2	Hapoel Petah Tikva
Maccabi Tel Aviv	1–4	Maccabi Herzliya
Hapoel Tel Aviv	2–0	Beitar Tubruk
Maccabi Netanya	4–0	Maccabi Ahi Nazareth
Ihud Bnei Baqa	0–1	Maccabi Petah Tikva
F.C. Nesher	0–1	Hapoel Ironi Bnei I'billin
Bnei Sakhnin	2–0	Beitar Jerusalem F.C.
Hapoel Nahf	0–6	Hapoel Ramat HaSharon
Hapoel Ironi Kiryat Shmona	0–1	Hapoel Rishon LeZion

=== Round of 16 ===
All matches were played on 11 March 2017.

Home team	Score	Away team
Maccabi Herzliya	2–2 (a.e.t.) (8–9 p)	Bnei Sakhnin
Maccabi Haifa	0–1	Hapoel Ra'anana
F.C. Ironi Ashdod	0–1	Maccabi Netanya
Hapoel Petah Tikva	0–1	Hapoel Be'er Sheva
Hapoel Tel Aviv	1–2	Maccabi Petah Tikva
Hapoel Ramat HaSharon	5–0	Maccabi Be'er Sheva
Hapoel Rishon LeZion	0–0 (a.e.t.) (4–1 p)	Hapoel Nazareth Illit/Emek Izrael
Bnei Yehuda	9–0	Hapoel Ironi Bnei I'billin

=== Quarter-finals ===
Matches were played on 5 April 2017.

Home team	Score	Away team
Maccabi Petah Tikva	1–4	Hapoel Rishon LeZion
Maccabi Netanya	1–3	Hapoel Ramat HaSharon
Bnei Yehuda	4–1	Bnei Sakhnin
Hapoel Ra'anana	2–0	Hapoel Be'er Sheva

=== Semi-finals ===
3 May 2017	Hapoel Ra'anana	2–1	Bnei Yehuda	Petah Tikva
17:00	Titelman 5'; Tomer 21'	Report	35' Gaira	Stadium: HaMoshava Stadium; Referee: Snir Levi

3 May 2017	Hapoel Ramat HaSharon	0–1 (a.e.t.)	Hapoel Rishon LeZion	Petah Tikva
19:55		Report	95' Malka	Stadium: HaMoshava Stadium; Referee: Arnes Duka

=== Final ===
17 May 2017
19:45

Hapoel Ra'anana	1–0	Ironi Rishon LeZion
Amsalem 35'	Report

HaMoshava Stadium, Petah Tikva
Referee: Sagi Berman
