= 2014–15 Israel Youth State Cup =

Tournament details
- Country: Israel

Final positions
- Champions: Hapoel Tel Aviv (7th title)
- Runners-up: Ironi Kiryat Shmona

Tournament statistics
- Matches played: 100
- Goals scored: 431 (4.31 per match)

The 2014–15 Israel Youth State Cup (Hebrew: גביע המדינה, Gvia HaMedina LeNoar) was the 60th season of Israel's nationwide football cup competition.

The competition was won by Hapoel Tel Aviv, who had beaten Ironi Kiryat Shmona 8–7 on penalties, after 0–0 in the final.

== Results ==
=== First round ===
Matches were played between 12 and 16 September 2014. Maccabi Netivot received a bye to the second round.

Home team	Score	Away team
Otzma Holon	w/o (Note: The IFA awarded the match to Otzma Holon, as F.C. Shikun HaMizrah fielded an ineligible player. The match originally ended 0–3 to Shikun HaMizrah.)	F.C. Shikun HaMizrah
Beitar Ironi Ma'ale Adumim	0–14	Hapoel Kiryat Ono
Beitar Ramat Gan	0–2	Hapoel Jerusalem
Ironi Or Yehuda	1–5 (Note: The match was abandoned at the 70th minute, with Hapoel Ashkelon leading 5–1, as Ironi Or Yehuda players protested a sending off by standing on the pitch and not trying to play the ball. After several minutes in which Ashkelon players passed the ball between them, the referee abandoned the match. The IFA Disciplinary Tribunal set the match's result to 5–1 to Ashkelon.)	Hapoel Ashkelon
F.C. Tira	0–4	Hapoel Hadera
F.C. Kadima-Zoran	2–6	Hapoel Pardesiya
F.C. Pardes Hanna-Karkur	2–3	Bnei Umm al-Fahm
Hapoel Baqa al-Gharbiyye	1–0	Maccabi Umm al-Fahm
Ahi Acre	2–4 (a.e.t.)	Hapoel Nazareth Illit Jezre'el
Maccabi Nahariya	w/o	Ihud Bnei Majd al-Krum
Hapoel Acre	3–1	Beitar Haifa
Bnei Sakhnin	w/o	Hapoel Acre
Maccabi Herzliya	5–0	Maccabi Emek Hefer
F.C. Bnei Jaffa Ortodoxim	1–3	Hapoel Morasha Ramat HaSharon
Hapoel Tzafririm Holon	1–6	Gadna Yehuda
Beitar Tel Aviv Ramla	7–0	Maccabi Amishav Petah Tikva
Hapoel Kafr Qasim Shouaa	1–0	Shimshon Bnei Tayibe
Hapoel Ihud Bnei Jatt	7–0	Hapoel Ka'abiyye
Hapoel Bnei Maghar	w/o	Ironi Tiberias
F.C. Nesher	8–0	Hapoel Ironi Bnei I'billin
Hapoel Shefa-'Amr	w/o	Hapoel Asi Gilboa
Hapoel F.C. Karmiel Safed	w/o	Maccabi Bnei Deir Hanna
Hapoel Bu'eine	w/o	F.C. Kfar Kama
Bnei Yehuda	7–1	Maccabi Shoham
Maccab Sha'arayim	0–3	Hapoel Bnei Lod
Hapoel Beit She'an	1–3	Hapoel Kafr Kanna
Hapoel Mateh Asher	2–3	Hapoel Deir Hanna
Maccabi Ahi Nazareth	7–0	Beitar Nahariya
F.C. Julis	3–1	Maccabi Ein Mahil
Maccabi Yavne	w/o	Ironi Beit Shemesh
Moadon Tzeirei Rahat	1–2	Maccabi Be'er Sheva
Maccabi Kiryat Gat	w/o	F.C. Matnas Gan Yavne
Hapoel Katamon Jerusalem	w/o (Note: The match was awarded to Katamon Jerusalem as Kiryat Ekron fielded an ineligible player.)	Maccabi Kiryat Ekron
Bnei Eilat	w/o	Hapoel Rahat
Beitar Kfar Saba	w/o	Maccabi Ironi Kfar Yona
Ihud Bnei Baka	4–0	Hapoel Kafr Kara
Hapoel Abirei Bat Yam	0–7	Hapoel Kfar Saba
Hapoel Nahlat Yehuda	1–2	Hapoel Hod HaSharon
F.C. Neve Yosef	4–0	Hapoel Migdal HaEmek
Ahfa Kafr Manda	1–8	Maccabi Tzur Shalom
Hapoel Afula	w/o	Hapoel Daliyat al-Karmel
Maccabi Ironi Acre	w/o	Maccabi Ironi Kiryat Ata
Hakoah Amidar Ramat Gan	2–2 (a.e.t.) (4–3 p)	Maccabi Kabilio Jaffa
A.S. Ramat Eliyahu	1–7	Hapoel Ramat HaSharon
F.C. Tzeirei Tayibe	2–2 (a.e.t.) (4–5 p)	Ihud Bnei Kafr Qara
F.C. Kafr Qasim	4–1	Shimshon Tel Aviv
Maccabi Hadera	2–8	Maccabi Barta'a
Maccabi Ironi Bat Yam	1–0	Haopel Herzliya
Hapoel Azor	2–0	Hapoel Mahane Yehuda

=== Second round ===
Matches were played on 10 and 11 October 2014. Ironi Tiberias and Hakoah Amidar Ramat Gan received a bye to the third round.

Home team	Score	Away team
Hapoel Kiryat Ono	4–0	Otzma Holon
Hapoel Jerusalem	2–1	Hapoel Ashkelon
Hapoel Hadera	5–0	Hapoel Pardesiya
Bnei Umm al-Fahm	2–3	Hapoel Baqa al-Gharbiyye
Hapoel Nazareth Illit Jezre'el	3–0 (a.e.t.)	Ihud Bnei Majd al-Krum
Hapoel Acre	0–1	Bnei Sakhnin
Maccabi Herzliya	3–0	Hapoel Morasha Ramat HaSharon
Gadna Yehuda	5–0	Beitar Tel Aviv Ramla
Hapoel Kafr Qasim Shouaa	1–2 (a.e.t.)	Hapoel Ihud Bnei Jatt
F.C. Nesher	w/o (Note: The match was awarded to F.C. Nesher as Asi Gilboa arrived late to the match and without uniforms.)	Hapoel Asi Gilboa
Hapoel F.C. Karmiel Safed	0–0 (a.e.t.) (4–3 p)	F.C. Kfar Kama
Bnei Yehuda	4–2	Hapoel Bnei Lod
Hapoel Kafr Kanna	4–1	Hapoel Deir Hanna
F.C. Julis	1–2	Maccabi Ahi Nazareth
Maccabi Yavne	4–0	Maccabi Netivot
Maccabi Be'er Sheva	1–0	Maccabi Kiryat Gat
Hapoel Katamon Jerusalem	1–2	Bnei Eilat
Beitar Kfar Saba	2–6	Ihud Bnei Baqa
Hapoel Kfar Saba	4–1	Hapoel Hod HaSharon
F.C. Neve Yosef	0–5	Maccabi Tzur Shalom
Hapoel Afula	3–3 (a.e.t.) (4–2 p)	Maccabi Ironi Kiryat Ata
Hapoel Ramat HaSharon	8–0	Ihud Bnei Kafr Qara
F.C. Kafr Qasim	7–0	Maccabi Barta'a
Maccabi Ironi Bat Yam	7–0	Hapoel Azor

=== Third round ===
Matches were played on 6 and 7 December 2014. Ironi Tiberias, Hapoel Ihud Bnei Jatt, Bnei Yehuda, Maccabi Yavne, Hakoah Amidar Ramat Gan and Maccabi Ironi Bat Yam received a bye to the fourth round.

Home team	Score	Away team
Hapoel Kiryat Ono	3–6 (a.e.t.)	Hapoel Jerusalem
Hapoel Hadera	3–0	Hapoel Baqa al-Gharbiyye
Hapoel Nazareth Illit Jezre'el	0–1 (a.e.t.)	Bnei Sakhnin
Maccabi Herzliya	3–1	Gadna Yehuda
F.C. Nesher	6–2	Hapoel F.C. Karmiel Safed
Hapoel Kafr Kanna	2–0	Maccabi Ahi Nazareth
Maccabi Be'er Sheva	6–0	Bnei Eilat
Ihud Bnei Baka	3–1	Hapoel Kfar Saba
Maccabi Tzur Shalom	1–3	Hapoel Afula
Hapoel Ramat HaSharon	1–0	F.C. Kafr Qasim

=== Fourth round ===
Home team	Score	Away team
Maccabi Tel Aviv	2–0	Hapoel Jerusalem
Hapoel Hadera	0–2	Hapoel Haifa
Bnei Sakhnin	0–1	Maccabi Herzliya
Hapoel Tel Aviv	8–0	Hapoel Ihud Bnei Jatt
Hapoel Petah Tikva	1–3	Hapoel Ra'anana
Hapoel Be'er Sheva	3–0	F.C. Ashdod
Hapoel Rishon LeZion	3–1	Ironi Tiberias
Beitar Tubruk	2–1	Beitar Jerusalem
Maccabi Netanya	1–0	F.C. Nesher
Bnei Yehuda	1–0	Maccabi Petah Tikva
Hapoel Ramat Gan	5–0	Hapoel Kafr Kanna
Sektzia Nes Tziona	5–1	Maccabi Yavne
Maccabi Be'er Sheva	0–5	Hapoel Ironi Kiryat Shmona
Ihud Bnei Baka	1–5	Maccabi Haifa
Hapoel Afula	2–3	Hakoah Amidar Ramat Gan
Hapoel Ramat HaSharon	5–1	Maccabi Ironi Bat Yam

=== Round of 16 ===
Home team	Score	Away team
Maccabi Tel Aviv	5–0	Hapoel Haifa
Maccabi Herzliya	1–2	Hapoel Tel Aviv
Hapoel Ra'anana	1–2 (a.e.t.)	Hapoel Be'er Sheva
Hapoel Rishon LeZion	0–1	Beitar Tubruk
Maccabi Netanya	2–0	Bnei Yehuda
Hapoel Ramat Gan	1–3	Sektzia Nes Tziona
Hapoel Ironi Kiryat Shmona	1–1 (a.e.t.) (4–3 p)	Maccabi Haifa
Hakoah Amidar Ramat Gan	1–4	Hapoel Ramat HaSharon

=== Quarter-finals ===
Home team	Score	Away team
Maccabi Tel Aviv	2–3	Hapoel Tel Aviv
Hapoel Be'er Sheva	2–3	Beitar Tubruk
Maccabi Netanya	4–0	Sektzia Nes Tziona
Hapoel Ironi Kiryat Shmona	2–1	Hapoel Ramat HaSharon

=== Semi-finals ===
18 March 2015	Hapoel Tel Aviv	1–1 (4–3 p)	Beitar Tubruk	Petah Tikva
17:00 (IDT)	Mucah 83' (o.g.)	Report (Hebrew)	Hadad 50'	Stadium: HaMoshava Stadium; Referee: Aviad Shiloach
	Penalties
	Spungin (penalty missed); I. Cohen (penalty scored); Eden Hershkowitz (penalty scored); R. Nahmias (penalty scored); Hasidim (penalty scored)		(penalty missed) Danin; (penalty scored) Keter; (penalty scored) Nesikovsky; (penalty scored) Maimoni

18 March 2015	Maccabi Netanya	0–1	Ironi Kiryat Shmona	Petah Tikva
19:55 (IDT)		Report (Hebrew)	Shamir 71'	Stadium: HaMoshava Stadium; Referee: Kobi Lechem

=== Final ===
1 April 2015
17:00 (IDT)

Hapoel Tel Aviv	0–0	Ironi Kiryat Shmona
	Report (Hebrew)
Penalties
Safouri (penalty missed); I. Cohen (penalty scored); Hadida (penalty scored); R. Nahmias (penalty scored); Hasidim (penalty missed); Dayan (penalty scored); Abdi (penalty scored); Schulmeister (penalty scored); Tagania (penalty scored); Lazar (penalty scored)	8–7	(penalty scored) Takiar; (penalty missed) Mizrahi; (penalty scored) D. Cohen; (penalty scored) Sheikh Ahmed; (penalty missed) Ujuko; (penalty scored) Shafsha; (penalty scored) Nassar; (penalty scored) I. Nahmias; (penalty scored) Hillel; (penalty missed) Golan

Municipal Stadium, Ramla
Referee: David Fuchsmann
