= 2017–18 Israel Youth State Cup =

Tournament details
- Country: Israel

Final positions
- Champions: Hapoel Ramat HaSharon
- Runners-up: Hapoel Kiryat Shmona

The 2017–18 Israel Youth State Cup (Hebrew: גביע המדינה, Gvia HaMedina LeNoar) was the 63rd season of Israel's nationwide football cup competition.

The competition was won by Hapoel Ramat HaSharon, who had beaten Hapoel Kiryat Shmona in the final.

== Results ==
=== Bracket ===
Premier League club joined the competition at the fourth round.

4th round
Maccabi Jaffa	0 (6)
Hapoel Tel Aviv	0 (7)
Maccabi Tzur Shalom	3
Maccabi Tel Aviv	2
Hapoel Ra'anana	2
Beitar Tubruk	0
Maccabi Haifa	4 (5)
Maccabi Petah Tikva	4 (3)
Hapoel Mate Asher	2
Ironi Kiryat Ata	1
Maccabi Herzliya	1
Maccabi Yavne	2
Hapoel Ashkelon	3
Ironi Modi'in	1
Beitar Tel Aviv Ramla	0
Hapoel Ramat HaSharon	2
Hapoel Kiryat Shmona	1 (4)
Hapoel Petah Tikva	1 (2)
Maccabi Ahi Nazareth	3
Bnei al-Salam Rahat	2
Hapoel Be'er Sheva	1 (4)
Bnei Sakhnin	1 (3)
Gadna Tel Aviv	1
Beitar Jerusalem	3
F.C. Ashdod	5
Hapoel Rishon LeZion	0
Maccabi Be'er Sheva	0
Hapoel Kfar Saba	3
Maccabi Netanya	2
Bnei Yehuda	0
Hapoel Haifa	1
Sektzia Nes Tziona	0

5th round
Maccabi Tzur Shalom	1
Hapoel Tel Aviv	0
Hapoel Ra'anana	1 (3)
Maccabi Haifa	1 (5)
Maccabi Yavne	4
Hapoel Mate Asher	1
Hapoel Ramat HaSharon	4
Hapoel Ashkelon	0
Maccabi Ahi Nazareth	0
Hapoel Kiryat Shmona	2
Hapoel Be'er Sheva	3
Beitar Jerusalem	2
F.C. Ashdod	1
Hapoel Kfar Saba	0
Hapoel Haifa	1
Maccabi Netanya	2

Quarter-finals
Maccabi Tzur Shalom	0
Maccabi Haifa	1
Maccabi Yavne	1
Hapoel Ramat HaSharon	2
Hapoel Be'er Sheva	2
Hapoel Kiryat Shmona	3
F.C. Ashdod	2
Maccabi Netanya	1

Semi-finals
Maccabi Haifa	1
Hapoel Ramat HaSharon	3
F.C. Ashdod	0
Hapoel Kiryat Shmona	3

Final
Hapoel Ramat HaSharon	1 (4)
Hapoel Kiryat Shmona	1 (3)

=== Final ===
22 May 2018
19:45

Hapoel Ramat HaSharon	1–1 (a.e.t.)	Hapoel Kiryat Shmona
Salame 75'	Report	7' Bushnak
Penalties
Magoz (penalty missed); Salame (penalty scored); Owoyemi (penalty scored); Ashkenazi (penalty scored); Ben-Moha (penalty scored)	4–3	(penalty scored) Vlijter; (penalty scored) Dahan; (penalty missed) Ben Shabat; (penalty scored) Lakau; (penalty missed) Brown

HaMoshava Stadium, Petah Tikva
