= 2007–08 Israeli Noar Leumit League =

Israeli Noar Leumit League
- Season: 2006–07
- Matches played: 240
- Goals scored: 717 (2.99 per match)
- Top goalscorer: Tal Ben Haim; Idan Sade (19)

The 2007–08 Israeli Noar Leumit League was the fourteenth season since its introduction in 1994. It is the top-tier football in Israel for teenagers between the ages 18–20.

Beitar Jerusalem won the title, whilst Hapoel Nazareth Illit and Hapoel Ashkelon were relegated and were replaced by Hapoel Kfar Saba and Hapoel Petah Tikva who were promoted from Ligat Noar Artzit.

== Final table ==
Pos	Team	Pld	W	D	L	GF	GA	GD	Pts	Qualification or relegation
1	Beitar Jerusalem (C)	30	19	7	4	52	24	+28	64	Noar Leumit League Champions
2	Maccabi Petah Tikva	30	18	4	8	50	30	+20	58	
3	F.C. Ashdod (Note: F.C. Ashdod won the Israeli Noar State Cup.)	30	15	10	5	50	27	+23	55	
4	Hapoel Tel Aviv	30	15	9	6	64	35	+29	54	
5	Maccabi Haifa	30	13	11	6	49	32	+17	50	
6	Beitar Nes Tubruk	30	13	9	8	51	33	+18	48	
7	Maccabi Netanya	30	14	4	12	48	43	+5	46	
8	Hapoel Kiryat Shmona	30	13	6	11	56	57	−1	45	
9	Bnei Yehuda	30	11	6	13	42	59	−17	39	
10	Maccabi Tel Aviv	30	9	11	10	42	43	−1	38	
11	Ironi Rishon LeZion	30	9	8	13	42	45	−3	35	
12	Hapoel Haifa	30	8	7	15	39	53	−14	31	
13	Bnei Sakhnin	30	7	9	14	31	48	−17	30	
14	Hapoel Be'er Shava	30	6	11	13	42	55	−13	29	
15	Hapoel Nazareth Illit (R)	30	7	7	16	39	56	−17	28	Relegation to Noar Arzit League
16	Hapoel Ashkelon (R)	30	3	1	26	20	77	−57	10	Relegation to Noar Arzit League

Rules for classification: 1) points; 2) goal difference; 3) number of goals scored.
(C) Champions; (R) Relegated
Notes:

2007–08 Noar Leumit League winners
Beitar Jerusalem
2nd title
