= 2001–02 Israeli Noar Leumit League =

The 2001–02 Israeli Noar Leumit League was the 8th season since its introduction in 1994 as the top-tier football in Israel for teenagers between the ages 18–20.

Maccabi Tel Aviv won the title, whilst Maccabi Netanya and Maccabi Herzliya were relegated.

== Final table ==
Pos	Team	Pld	W	D	L	GF	GA	GD	Pts	Qualification or relegation
1	Maccabi Tel Aviv (C)	30	22	2	6	88	32	+56	68	
2	Maccabi Haifa	30	20	7	3	83	26	+57	67	
3	F.C. Ashdod	30	15	6	9	63	50	+13	51	
4	Hapoel Haifa	30	15	6	9	51	43	+8	51	
5	Hapoel Tel Aviv	30	15	5	10	56	44	+12	50	
6	Gadna Yehuda	30	12	8	10	47	51	−4	44	
7	Maccabi Petah Tikva	30	13	4	13	45	39	+6	43	
8	Hapoel Kfar Saba	30	12	4	14	45	54	−9	40	
9	Hapoel Petah Tikva	30	11	6	13	31	50	−19	39	
10	Hapoel Be'er Sheva	30	11	3	16	55	45	+10	36	
11	F.C. Neve Yosef	30	10	6	14	53	60	−7	36	
12	Ironi Rishon LeZion	30	10	5	15	48	71	−23	35	
13	Beitar Nes Tubruk	30	9	6	15	47	49	−2	33	
14	Beitar Jerusalem	30	11	6	13	31	50	−19	32 (Note: 7 points deducted)	
15	Maccabi Netanya (R)	30	7	9	14	27	52	−25	30	Relegation to Noar Arzit League
16	Maccabi Herzliya (R)	30	5	6	19	25	72	−47	21	Relegation to Noar Arzit League

Source: one.co.il
Rules for classification: 1st points; 2nd goal difference; 3rd matches won; 4th goals scored; 5th head-to-head; 6th decision match
(C) Champions; (R) Relegated
Notes:

2001–02 Noar Leumit League winners
Maccabi Tel Aviv
4th title
