= 2009–10 Israeli Noar Leumit League =

Israeli Noar Leumit League
- Season: 2009–10
- Matches played: 240
- Goals scored: 696 (2.9 per match)
- Top goalscorer: Ofir Melamed (18)

The 2009–10 Israeli Noar Leumit League was the sixteenth season since its introduction in 1994. It is the top-tier football in Israel for teenagers between the ages 18–20. It began on 14 August 2009 and ended on 29 May 2010.

Maccabi Haifa won the title, whilst Hapoel Petah Tikva and Hakoah Amidar Ramat Gan were relegated.

Location of teams in the 2009–10 Israeli Noar Leumit League

== League table ==
Pos	Team	Pld	W	D	L	GF	GA	GD	Pts	Qualification or relegation
1	Maccabi Haifa (C)	30	23	6	1	65	17	+48	75	Noar Leumit League Champions
2	Maccabi Tel Aviv	30	20	7	3	70	26	+44	67	
3	Maccabi Netanya	30	17	7	6	53	32	+21	58	
4	Hapoel Ironi Kiryat Shmona	30	15	4	11	43	41	+2	49	
5	Hapoel Tel Aviv	30	14	6	10	54	27	+27	48	
6	F.C. Ashdod	30	12	8	10	47	45	+2	44	
7	Beitar Jerusalem	30	11	10	9	40	38	+2	43	
8	Maccabi Petah Tikva	30	11	8	11	34	42	−8	41	
9	Hapoel Kfar Saba	30	10	9	11	37	40	−3	39	
10	Hapoel Haifa	30	11	6	13	47	39	+8	39	
11	Beitar Nes Tubruk	30	7	10	13	41	58	−17	31	
12	Ironi Rishon LeZion (Note: Ironi Rishon LeZion won the Israeli Noar State Cup.)	30	8	6	16	36	54	−18	30	
13	Bnei Sakhnin	30	6	10	14	34	58	−24	28	
14	Hapoel Ra'anana	30	7	7	16	39	66	−27	28	
15	Hapoel Petah Tikva (R)	30	5	9	16	32	48	−16	24	Relegation to Noar Arzit League
16	Hakoah Amidar Ramat Gan (R)	30	4	7	19	26	65	−39	19	Relegation to Noar Arzit League

Source: Israel Football Association
(C) Champions; (R) Relegated
Notes:

2009–10 Noar Leumit League winners
Maccabi Haifa
5th title
