= 2003–04 Israeli Noar Leumit League =

The 2003–04 Israeli Noar Leumit League was the 10th season since its introduction in 1994 as the top-tier football in Israel for teenagers between the ages 18–20.

Maccabi Haifa won the title, whilst Hapoel Be'er Sheva and Gadna Yehuda were relegated.

== Final table ==
Pos	Team	Pld	W	D	L	GF	GA	GD	Pts	Qualification or relegation
1	Maccabi Haifa (C)	30	23	3	4	87	25	+62	72	
2	Maccabi Tel Aviv	30	17	8	5	58	30	+28	59	
3	Hapoel Haifa	30	14	11	5	61	34	+27	53	
4	Hapoel Tel Aviv	30	14	10	6	64	33	+31	52	
5	Maccabi Petah Tikva	30	14	5	11	35	33	+2	47	
6	Ironi Rishon LeZion	30	12	8	10	46	47	−1	44	
7	Hapoel Kfar Saba	30	12	6	12	46	40	+6	42	
8	Beitar Jerusalem	30	12	5	13	47	41	+6	41	
9	Maccabi Netanya	30	11	7	12	44	47	−3	40	
10	Maccabi Herzliya	30	10	8	12	35	53	−18	38	
11	Beitar Nes Tubruk	30	10	7	13	44	48	−4	37	
12	F.C. Ashdod	30	10	6	14	29	45	−16	36	
13	Bnei Yehuda	30	10	5	15	44	60	−16	35	
14	F.C. Neve Yosef	30	8	9	13	32	52	−20	33	
15	Hapoel Be'er Sheva (R)	30	6	5	19	26	64	−38	23	Relegation to Noar Arzit League
16	Gadna Yehuda (R)	30	3	5	22	29	75	−46	14	Relegation to Noar Arzit League

Source: one.co.il
Rules for classification: 1st points; 2nd goal difference; 3rd matches won; 4th goals scored; 5th head-to-head; 6th decision match
(C) Champions; (R) Relegated

2003–04 Noar Leumit League winners
Maccabi Haifa
3rd title
