= 2008–09 Israeli Noar Leumit League =

Israeli Noar Leumit League
- Season: 2008–09
- Matches played: 240
- Goals scored: 706 (2.94 per match)
- Top goalscorer: Or Hasson (16)

The 2008–09 Israeli Noar Leumit League was the 13th season since its introduction in 1994. It is the top-tier football in Israel for teenagers between the ages 18–20.

Maccabi Haifa won the title, whilst Bnei Yehuda and Hapoel Be'er Sheva were relegated.

== Final table ==
| Pos | Team | Pld | W | D | L | GF | GA | GD | Pts | Qualification or relegation |
|---|---|---|---|---|---|---|---|---|---|---|
| 1 | Maccabi Haifa (C) | 30 | 18 | 6 | 6 | 63 | 34 | +29 | 60 | Noar Leumit League Champions |
| 2 | Maccabi Tel Aviv | 30 | 17 | 5 | 8 | 53 | 30 | +23 | 56 | |
| 3 | Beitar Jerusalem | 30 | 15 | 6 | 9 | 47 | 34 | +13 | 51 | |
| 4 | Ironi Rishon LeZion | 30 | 14 | 8 | 8 | 45 | 29 | +16 | 50 | |
| 5 | F.C. Ashdod | 30 | 13 | 10 | 7 | 42 | 37 | +5 | 49 | |
| 6 | Hapoel Tel Aviv (Note: Hapoel Tel Aviv won the Israeli Noar State Cup.) | 30 | 13 | 8 | 9 | 52 | 42 | +10 | 47 | |
| 7 | Hapoel Haifa | 30 | 13 | 6 | 11 | 61 | 53 | +8 | 45 | |
| 8 | Beitar Nes Tubruk | 30 | 12 | 7 | 11 | 39 | 41 | −2 | 43 | |
| 9 | Maccabi Netanya | 30 | 10 | 12 | 8 | 44 | 37 | +7 | 42 | |
| 10 | Maccabi Petah Tikva | 30 | 10 | 9 | 11 | 43 | 42 | +1 | 39 | |
| 11 | Bnei Sakhnin | 30 | 9 | 11 | 10 | 44 | 47 | −3 | 38 | |
| 12 | Hapoel Petah Tikva | 30 | 9 | 9 | 12 | 37 | 41 | −4 | 36 | |
| 13 | Hapoel Kfar Saba | 30 | 10 | 6 | 14 | 37 | 56 | −19 | 36 | |
| 14 | Ironi Kiryat Shmona | 30 | 9 | 6 | 15 | 35 | 48 | −13 | 33 | |
| 15 | Hapoel Be'er Sheva (R) | 30 | 4 | 6 | 20 | 32 | 65 | −33 | 18 | Relegation to Noar Arzit League |
| 16 | Bnei Yehuda (R) | 30 | 4 | 5 | 21 | 32 | 70 | −38 | 17 | Relegation to Noar Arzit League |

Rules for classification: 1) points; 2) goal difference; 3) number of goals scored.
(C) Champions; (R) Relegated
Notes:

2008–09 Noar Leumit League winners
Maccabi Haifa
4th title
