= 2002–03 Israeli Noar Leumit League =

The 2002–03 Israeli Noar Leumit League was the 9th season since its introduction in 1994 as the top-tier football in Israel for teenagers between the ages 18–20.

Maccabi Haifa won the title, whilst Hapoel Petah Tikva and Ironi Nir Ramat HaSharon were relegated.

== Final table ==
Pos	Team	Pld	W	D	L	GF	GA	GD	Pts	Qualification or relegation
1	Maccabi Haifa (C)	30	24	3	3	73	27	+46	75	
2	Ironi Rishon LeZion	30	16	6	8	63	42	+21	54	
3	Hapoel Tel Aviv	30	15	7	8	46	35	+11	52	
4	Maccabi Petah Tikva	30	15	7	8	50	40	+10	52	
5	Maccabi Tel Aviv	30	14	8	8	47	27	+20	50	
6	Hapoel Be'er Sheva	30	14	6	10	59	47	+12	48	
7	Hapoel Haifa	30	12	4	14	35	52	−17	40	
8	Beitar Jerusalem	30	10	8	12	44	48	−4	38	
9	F.C. Ashdod	30	10	5	15	44	51	−7	35	
10	Bnei Yehuda	30	9	8	13	38	48	−10	35	
11	Beitar Nes Tubruk	30	9	7	14	42	40	+2	34	
12	Hapoel Kfar Saba	30	9	7	14	39	53	−14	34	
13	Gadna Yehuda	30	10	4	16	51	69	−18	34	
14	F.C. Neve Yosef	30	9	5	16	41	54	−13	32	
15	Hapoel Petah Tikva (R)	30	8	8	14	29	42	−13	32	Relegation to Noar Arzit League
16	Ironi Nir Ramat HaSharon (R)	30	6	7	17	34	60	−26	25	Relegation to Noar Arzit League

Source: one.co.il
Rules for classification: 1st points; 2nd goal difference; 3rd matches won; 4th goals scored; 5th head-to-head; 6th decision match
(C) Champions; (R) Relegated

2002–03 Noar Leumit League winners
Maccabi Haifa
2nd title
