= 2000–01 Israeli Noar Leumit League =

The 2000–01 Israeli Noar Leumit League was the seventh season since its introduction in 1994. It is the top-tier football in Israel for teenagers between the ages 18–20.

Maccabi Tel Aviv won the title, whilst Bnei Yehuda and Hapoel Ra'anana were relegated.

== Final table ==
Pos	Team	Pld	W	D	L	GF	GA	GD	Pts	Qualification or relegation
1	Maccabi Tel Aviv (C)	30	17	11	2	61	23	+38	62	Noar Leumit League Champions
2	Maccabi Haifa	30	19	3	8	51	26	+25	60 (Note: Deducted 1 point)	
3	Hapoel Tel Aviv	30	15	8	7	50	34	+16	53	
4	Ironi Rishon LeZion	30	14	5	11	50	33	+17	47	
5	F.C. Ashdod (Note: F.C. Ashdod won the Israeli Noar State Cup.)	30	12	9	9	56	41	+15	45	
6	Hapoel Petah Tikva	30	12	8	10	47	42	+5	44	
7	Hapoel Be'er Shava	30	10	12	8	42	34	+8	42	
8	Beitar Nes Tubruk	30	11	9	10	33	32	+1	42	
9	Maccabi Petah Tikva	30	10	10	10	46	36	+10	40	
10	Beitar Jerusalem	30	10	9	11	38	41	−3	39	
11	Maccabi Netanya	30	8	13	9	29	31	−2	37	
12	Hapoel Haifa	30	7	14	9	41	35	+6	35	
13	Maccabi Herzliya	30	8	9	13	33	41	−8	33	
14	Hapoel Kfar Saba	30	9	6	15	27	47	−20	33	
15	Bnei Yehuda (R)	30	8	8	14	35	49	−14	32	Relegation to Noar Arzit League
16	Hapoel Ra'anana (R)	30	3	0	27	15	94	−79	9	Relegation to Noar Arzit League

Rules for classification: 1) points; 2) goal difference; 3) number of goals scored.
(C) Champions; (R) Relegated
Notes:

2000–01 Noar Leumit League winners
Maccabi Tel Aviv
3rd title
