= 2010–11 Israeli Noar Leumit League =

Israeli Noar Leumit League
- Season: 2010–11
- Matches played: 240
- Goals scored: 612 (2.55 per match)
- Top goalscorer: Mu'nas Dabbur; Roi Kahat (18)

The 2010–11 Israeli Noar Leumit League was the seventeenth season since its introduction in 1994. It is the top-tier football in Israel for teenagers between the ages 18–20. It began on 21 August 2010 and ended on 28 May 2011.

Maccabi Tel Aviv won the title, whilst Bnei Sakhnin and Hapoel Ramat Gan were relegated.

Location of teams in the 2010–11 Israeli Noar Leumit League

== League table ==
Pos	Team	Pld	W	D	L	GF	GA	GD	Pts	Qualification or relegation
1	Maccabi Tel Aviv (C)	30	23	5	2	74	22	+52	74 (Note: Maccabi Tel Aviv also won the Israeli Noar State Cup.)	Noar Leumit League Champions
2	Maccabi Haifa	30	19	5	6	56	22	+34	62	
3	Beitar Nes Tubruk	30	15	6	9	57	39	+18	51	
4	Hapoel Kfar Saba	30	13	8	9	39	29	+10	47	
5	Bnei Yehuda	30	12	6	12	43	45	−2	42	
6	Beitar Jerusalem	30	12	5	13	40	36	+4	41	
7	Maccabi Petah Tikva	30	9	13	8	39	38	+1	40	
8	Hapoel Haifa	30	11	7	12	31	44	−13	40	
9	Hapoel Ironi Kiryat Shmona	30	10	9	11	30	37	−7	39	
10	F.C. Ashdod	30	10	7	13	28	34	−6	37	
11	Hapoel Tel Aviv	30	10	7	13	38	45	−7	37	
12	Ironi Rishon LeZion	30	8	9	13	28	42	−14	33	
13	Maccabi Netanya	30	8	8	14	28	39	−11	32	
14	Hapoel Ra'anana	30	6	12	12	33	55	−22	30	
15	Bnei Sakhnin (R)	30	8	5	17	26	40	−14	29	Relegation to Noar Arzit League
16	Hapoel Ramat Gan (R)	30	6	8	16	22	45	−23	26	Relegation to Noar Arzit League

Updated to match(es) played on 28 May 2011. Source: Israel Football Association
Rules for classification: 1) points; 2) goal difference; 3) number of goals scored.
(C) Champions; (R) Relegated
