= 2014–15 Israeli Noar Premier League =

Israeli Noar Premier League
- Season: 2014–15
- Matches: 240
- Goals: 753 (3.14 per match)
- Top goalscorer: Mohammed Awaed (21)

The 2014–15 Israeli Noar Premier League was the 21st season since its introduction in 1994 as the top-tier football in Israel for teenagers between the ages 18–20, and the 4th under the name Noar Premier League.

Maccabi Tel Aviv won the title, whilst Hapoel Ramat Gan and Hapoel Petah Tikva were relegated. Bnei Sakhnin (from the Northern division) and Bnei Yehuda (from the Southern division) won their respective Noar Leumit League divisions and promotion to 2015–16.

== Final table ==
Pos	Team	Pld	W	D	L	GF	GA	GD	Pts	Qualification or relegation
1	Maccabi Tel Aviv (C)	30	23	2	5	89	20	+69	71	
2	Maccabi Haifa	30	22	2	6	71	31	+40	68	
3	Ironi Kiryat Shmona	30	16	8	6	52	34	+18	56	
4	Hapoel Tel Aviv	30	16	6	8	58	36	+22	54	
5	Hapoel Be'er Sheva	30	16	5	9	47	43	+4	53	
6	Beitar Nes Tubruk	30	14	8	8	49	46	+3	50	
7	F.C. Ashdod	30	14	4	12	48	44	+4	46	
8	Maccabi Netanya	30	15	1	14	47	45	+2	46	
9	Hapoel Ra'anana	30	12	5	13	50	54	−4	41	
10	Hapoel Haifa	30	12	1	17	52	59	−7	37	
11	Beitar Jerusalem	30	10	6	14	35	50	−15	36	
12	Maccabi Petah Tikva	30	9	5	16	33	48	−15	32	
13	Hapoel Rishon LeZion	30	8	5	17	31	63	−32	29	
14	Sektzia Nes Tziona	30	8	4	18	32	56	−24	28	
15	Hapoel Ramat Gan (R)	30	8	3	19	32	58	−26	27	Relegation to Noar Leumit League
16	Hapoel Petah Tikva (R)	30	3	3	24	27	66	−39	12	Relegation to Noar Leumit League

Source: IFA (in Hebrew)
Rules for classification: 1st points; 2nd goal difference; 3rd matches won; 4th goals scored; 5th head-to-head; 6th decision match
(C) Champions; (R) Relegated

2013–14 Noar Leumit League winners

8th title
