= Ron Shushan =

Israeli footballer

Ron Shushan רון שושן
Personal information
- Full name: Ron Shushan
- Date of birth: 11 June 1993 (age 33)
- Place of birth: Haifa, Israel
- Height: 1.83 m (6 ft 0 in)
- Position: Goalkeeper

Youth career
- Maccabi Haifa

Senior career*
Years	Team	Apps	(Gls)
2013–2016	Maccabi Haifa	1	(0)
2014–2016	→ Hapoel Nazareth Illit (loan)	72	(0)
2016–2017	Maccabi Netanya	10	(0)
2017–2019	Hapoel Afula	72	(0)
2019–2021	F.C. Ashdod	3	(0)
2021	Hapoel Rishon LeZion	8	(0)
2021–2022	Hapoel Ramat Gan	35	(0)

International career
2008–2009	Israel U16	35	(0)
2009	Israel U17	2	(0)
2011–2012	Israel U19	6	(0)
- * Club domestic league appearances and goals as of 15 June 2023

Ron Shushan (Hebrew: רון שושן; born 11 June 1993) is an Israeli footballer who plays as a goalkeeper. Ron is the brother of Mor Shushan.

== Career ==
Shushan was brought up through the Maccabi Haifa youth system. During the 2012–13 season Shushan was the starting goalkeeper for Maccabi Haifa's youth team, winning with the team both the U-19 league and cup.

Shushan made his Israeli Premier League debut on 17 May 2014, against Hapoel Be'er Sheva in the club's final league match of the season. The game finished 1–1.

On 3 September 2014 Shushan was loaned to Hapoel Nazareth Illit, where he played for the remainder of the season, and won the local 'Best Newcomer' award.

== Personal life ==
Ron shushan hosts the podcast "Fresh Talk" with Bar Timor. Ron is also an Executive Vice President of the Podium podcast network.

== Statistics ==
Club performance			League		Cup		League Cup		Continental		Total	
Season	Club	League	Apps	Goals	Apps	Goals	Apps	Goals	Apps	Goals	Apps	Goals
2013–14	Maccabi Haifa	Prem. League	1	0	0	0	0	0	0	0	1	0
2014–15	Maccabi Haifa	Prem. League	0	0	0	0	1	0	0	0	1	0
2014–15	Hapoel Nazareth Illit	Liga Leumit	37	0	1	0	0	0	0	0	38	0
Career total			38	0	1	0	1	0	0	0	40	0

== Honours ==
- Liga Leumit
  - Winner (1): 2016-17
