= 1996–97 Israeli Noar Leumit League =

Football league season

The 1996–97 Israeli Noar Leumit League was the 47th season of youth football league in Israel and 3rd season of the Noar Leumit League since its introduction in 1994, as the top-tier football in Israel for teenagers between the ages 18–20.

Maccabi Tel Aviv won the title, whilst Maccabi Ahi Nazareth and Hapoel Hadera were relegated.

== Final table ==
Pos	Team	Pld	W	D	L	GF	GA	GD	Pts	Qualification or relegation
1	Maccabi Tel Aviv	26	22	2	2	79	18	+61	68	Champions
2	Maccabi Haifa	26	15	6	5	52	26	+26	51	
3	Hapoel Petah Tikva	26	14	6	6	45	26	+19	48	
4	Bnei Yehuda	25	14	4	7	50	28	+22	46	
5	Gadna Tel Aviv Yehuda	26	12	5	9	35	38	−3	41	
6	Hapoel Haifa	26	10	10	6	47	31	+16	40	
7	Maccabi Petah Tikva	26	9	6	11	36	39	−3	33	
8	Hapoel Be'er Sheva	26	8	8	10	41	36	+5	32	
9	Maccabi Netanya	26	10	1	15	40	44	−4	31	
10	Hapoel Jerusalem	26	8	7	11	38	43	−5	31	
11	Hapoel Tel Aviv	26	9	3	14	37	36	+1	30	
12	Hapoel Tzafririm Holon	26	8	3	15	31	62	−31	27	
13	Maccabi Ahi Nazareth	26	4	7	15	22	80	−58	19	Relegated
14	Hapoel Hadera	26	4	2	20	17	63	−46	14	Relegated

Updated to match(es) played on 24 June 1997. Source: IFA (in Hebrew)

1996–97 Noar Leumit League winners
Maccabi Tel Aviv
2nd title (16th overall)
