= 2005–06 Israeli Noar Leumit League =

The 2005–06 Israeli Noar Leumit League was the 12th season since its introduction in 1994 as the top-tier football in Israel for teenagers between the ages 18–20.

Hapoel Haifa won the title, whilst Hapoel Kfar Saba and Hapoel Jerusalem were relegated.

== Final table ==
Pos	Team	Pld	W	D	L	GF	GA	GD	Pts	Qualification or relegation
1	Hapoel Haifa (C)	30	19	7	4	65	43	+22	64	
2	Maccabi Haifa	30	16	5	9	58	40	+18	53	
3	Hapoel Tel Aviv	30	16	4	10	61	41	+20	52	
4	Maccabi Petah Tikva	30	13	11	6	50	33	+17	50	
5	Maccabi Tel Aviv	30	14	7	9	44	31	+13	49	
6	Beitar Jerusalem	30	12	8	10	49	35	+14	44	
7	Beitar Nes Tubruk	30	11	11	8	38	29	+9	44	
8	Hapoel Petah Tikva	30	10	10	10	31	25	+6	40	
9	Hapoel Nazareth Illit Jezre'el	30	10	8	12	42	49	−7	38	
10	F.C. Ashdod	30	9	10	11	47	44	+3	37	
11	Maccabi Herzliya	30	10	6	14	33	45	−12	36	
12	Ironi Rishon LeZion	30	9	7	14	38	63	−25	34	
13	Bnei Yehuda	30	7	12	11	35	43	−8	33	
14	Maccabi Netanya	30	7	10	13	37	43	−6	31	
15	Hapoel Kfar Saba (R)	30	9	4	17	36	64	−28	31	Relegation to Noar Arzit League
16	Hapoel Jerusalem (R)	30	4	8	18	26	62	−36	20	Relegation to Noar Arzit League

Source: one.co.il
Rules for classification: 1st points; 2nd goal difference; 3rd matches won; 4th goals scored; 5th head-to-head; 6th decision match
(C) Champions; (R) Relegated

2005–06 Noar Leumit League winners
Hapoel Haifa
1st title
