= 2011–12 Israeli Noar Premier League =

Israeli Noar Premier League
- Season: 2011–12
- Matches played: 240
- Goals scored: 727 (3.03 per match)
- Top goalscorer: Gil Itzhak (20)

The 2011–12 Israeli Noar Premier League was the 18th season since its introduction in 1994 as the top-tier football in Israel for teenagers between the ages 18–20, and the first under the name Noar Premier League.

Maccabi Tel Aviv won the title, whilst Hapoel Ra'anana and Maccabi Herzliya were relegated.

== Final table ==
Pos	Team	Pld	W	D	L	GF	GA	GD	Pts	Qualification or relegation
1	Maccabi Tel Aviv (C)	30	20	6	4	67	27	+40	66	
2	Maccabi Haifa	30	17	6	7	58	25	+33	57	
3	Beitar Nes Tubruk	30	17	3	10	55	42	+13	54	
4	Hapoel Kfar Saba	30	14	6	10	52	35	+17	48	
5	Bnei Yehuda	30	14	5	11	46	40	+6	47	
6	Beitar Jerusalem	30	13	3	14	46	46	0	42	
7	Hapoel Be'er Sheva	30	13	3	14	33	65	−32	42	
8	Hapoel Tel Aviv	28	12	4	12	50	62	−12	40	
9	Ironi Kiryat Shmona	30	11	6	13	60	53	+7	39	
10	Hapoel Rishon LeZion	30	10	9	11	48	46	+2	39	
11	Maccabi Netanya	30	9	12	9	36	32	+4	39	
12	F.C. Ashdod	30	10	8	12	36	41	−5	38	
13	Maccabi Petah Tikva	30	11	5	14	39	38	+1	38	
14	Hapoel Haifa	30	10	4	16	38	53	−15	34	
15	Hapoel Ra'anana (R)	30	8	8	14	38	64	−26	32	Relegation to Noar Leumit League
16	Maccabi Herzliya (R)	30	5	4	21	25	58	−33	19	Relegation to Noar Leumit League

Source: IFA (in Hebrew)
Rules for classification: 1st points; 2nd goal difference; 3rd matches won; 4th goals scored; 5th head-to-head; 6th decision match
(C) Champions; (R) Relegated

2011–12 Noar Leumit League winners
Maccabi Tel Aviv
7th title
