= Mohammad Abu Fani =

Israeli footballer (born 1998)

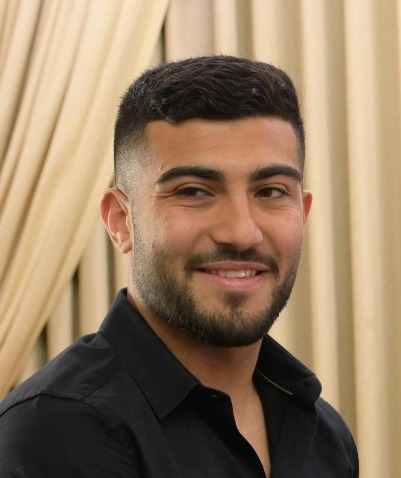
- Abu Fani in 2023

Personal information
- Date of birth: 27 April 1998 (age 28)
- Place of birth: Kafr Qara, Israel
- Height: 1.69 m (5 ft 7 in)
- Position: Midfielder

Team information
- Current team: Red Star Belgrade
- Number: 15

Youth career
- 2007–2017: Maccabi Haifa

Senior career*
Years	Team	Apps	(Gls)
2017–2023	Maccabi Haifa	103	(10)
2017–2018	→ Hapoel Ramat Gan (loan)	26	(2)
2018–2020	→ Hapoel Hadera (loan)	46	(5)
2023–2026	Ferencváros	71	(8)
2026–	Red Star Belgrade	10	(2)

International career^{‡}
2016–2017	Israel U19	19	(5)
2018–2020	Israel U21	8	(0)
2020–	Israel	33	(4)
- * Club domestic league appearances and goals as of 21 November 2026 ‡ National team caps and goals as of 20:43, 14 October 2025 (UTC)

Mohammad Abu Fani (or Mohamad Abo-Fani, Arabic: مُحَمَّد أَبُو فَانِيّ, Hebrew: מוחמד אבו פאני; born 27 April 1998) is an Israeli professional footballer who plays as a midfielder for Serbian SuperLiga club Red Star Belgrade and the Israel national team.

== Early life ==
Abu Fani was born in Kafr Qara, Israel, to a Muslim-Arab family. His father Sami Abu Fani, a former local footballer, supported Mohammad's football career from a young age. He has two sisters, Rawan and Lareen.

== Club career ==
=== Maccabi Haifa ===
On 13 May 2017, Abu Fani made his debut for Maccabi Haifa in a 1–0 loss to Bnei Sakhnin, coming in as a substitute at the 46th minute. At youth level, he was part of the Maccabi Haifa U-21 team which won two consecutive championships, in 2015–16 and 2016–17, as well as reaching the UEFA Youth League play off stage.

=== Ferencváros ===
On 15 June 2023, Abu Fani signed for four years for Ferencváros.

On 20 April 2024, the Ferencváros–Kisvárda tie ended with a goalless draw at the Groupama Aréna on the 29th match day of the 2023–24 Nemzeti Bajnokság I season which meant that Ferencváros won their 35th championship.

On 15 May 2024, Ferencváros were defeated by Paks 2–0 in the 2024 Magyar Kupa Final at the Puskás Aréna.

Abu Fani won the 2024–25 Nemzeti Bajnokság I season with Ferencváros after beating Győr 2–1 at the ETO Park on the last match day on 24 May 2025. On 9 May 2026, he won the 2025–26 Magyar Kupa season with Ferencváros by beating Zalaegerszegi TE 1–0 in the 2026 Magyar Kupa final at Puskás Aréna.

=== Red Star Belgrade ===
On 13 June 2026, Abu Fani joined Serbian SuperLiga club Red Star Belgrade on a three-year deal with an option for a fourth.

== International career ==
Since youth, Abu Fani played for both the under-19 and the under-21 national teams of Israel, appearing in 18 matches, and scoring three goals for the U19s.

He made his senior debut for Israel on 8 October 2020 in a UEFA Euro 2020 qualifying play-offs away match against Scotland.

Abu Fani has faced Islamophobic taunts from far-right Israeli football hooligans despite playing for the national team. During his team's 2–1 victory over Andorra at a Euro 2024 tournament qualifier, Abu Fani was booed and called a "terrorist" by far-right fans of Beitar Jerusalem. After the incident, Abu Fani's father said "When the opposing team swears at you, it’s a sign you’re a good player. When it comes from your fans, it hurts."

On 9 September 2024, Abu Fani scored his first senior international goal against Italy in the UEFA Nations League. A month later in the return match against Italy, Abu Fani scored an "Olimpico" goal directly from the corner kick.

== Career statistics ==
=== Club ===
As of match played 18 October 2026

Appearances and goals by club, season and competition
Club	Season	League			Cup		Europe		Other		Total	
Club	Season	Division	Apps	Goals	Apps	Goals	Apps	Goals	Apps	Goals	Apps	Goals
Maccabi Haifa	2016–17	Israeli Premier League	2	0	—		—		—		2	0
Maccabi Haifa	2018–19	Israeli Premier League	8	1	—		—		—		8	1
Maccabi Haifa	2019–20	Israeli Premier League	0	0	—		3 (Note: Appearances in UEFA Europa League)	0	—		3	0
Maccabi Haifa	2020–21	Israeli Premier League	34	2	4	0	4	1	—		42	3
Maccabi Haifa	2021–22	Israeli Premier League	26	3	6	1	11 (Note: Two appearances in UEFA Champions League, nine appearances and one goal in UEFA Conference League)	1	1 (Note: Appearances in Israel Super Cup)	1	44	6
Maccabi Haifa	2022–23	Israeli Premier League	33	4	3	2	11 (Note: Appearances in UEFA Europa League)	1	1	0	48	7
Maccabi Haifa	Total		103	10	13	3	29	3	2	1	147	17
Hapoel Ramat Gan (loan)	2017–18	Israeli Premier League	26	2	3	0	—		—		29	2
Hapoel Hadera (loan)	2018–19	Israeli Premier League	18	1	2	0	—		—		20	1
Hapoel Hadera (loan)	2019–20	Israeli Premier League	28	4	1	0	—		—		29	4
Hapoel Hadera (loan)	Total		46	5	3	0	—		—		49	5
Ferencváros	2023–24	Nemzeti Bajnokság I	28	4	5	1	14 (Note: One appearance in UEFA Champions League, thirteen appearances and one goal in UEFA Conference League)	1	—		47	6
Ferencváros	2024–25	Nemzeti Bajnokság I	26	2	3	1	15 (Note: Three appearances in UEFA Champions League, twelve appearances and one goal in UEFA Europa League)	1	—		44	4
Ferencváros	2025–26	Nemzeti Bajnokság I	17	2	4	2	4	0	—		25	4
Ferencváros	Total		71	8	12	4	33	2	—		116	14
Red Star Belgrade	2026–27	Serbian SuperLiga	8	3	0	0	2 (Note: Two appearances in UEFA Champions League)	0	—		10	3
Career total			254	28	31	7	64	5	2	1	351	41

=== International ===
As of match played 15 October 2025

Appearances and goals by national team and year
National team	Year	Apps	Goals
Israel	2020	4	0
Israel	2021	6	0
Israel	2022	3	0
Israel	2023	7	0
Israel	2024	6	2
Israel	2025	5	2
Total		33	4

==== International goals ====
No.	Date	Venue	Opponent	Score	Result	Competition
1	10 September 2024	Bozsik Aréna, Budapest, Hungary	Italy	1–2	1–2	2024–25 UEFA Nations League
2	14 October 2024	Stadio Friuli, Udine, Italy	Italy	1–2	1–4	2024–25 UEFA Nations League
3	25 March 2025	Nagyerdei Stadion, Debrecen, Hungary	Norway	1–1	2–4	2026 FIFA World Cup qualification
4	6 June 2025	Lilleküla Stadium, Tallinn, Estonia	Estonia	3–1	3–1	2026 FIFA World Cup qualification

== Honours ==
Maccabi Haifa

- Israeli Premier League: 2020–21, 2021–22, 2022–23
- Israeli Toto Cup: 2021–22
- Israel Super Cup: 2021

Ferencváros

- Nemzeti Bajnokság I: 2023–24, 2024–25
- Hungarian Cup: 2025–26
