= 2004–05 Israeli Noar Leumit League =

The 2004–05 Israeli Noar Leumit League was the 11th season since its introduction in 1994 as the top-tier football in Israel for teenagers between the ages 18–20.

Maccabi Tel Aviv won the title, whilst Hapoel Acre and F.C. Neve Yosef were relegated.

== Final table ==
| Pos | Team | Pld | W | D | L | GF | GA | GD | Pts | Qualification or relegation |
|---|---|---|---|---|---|---|---|---|---|---|
| 1 | Maccabi Tel Aviv (C) | 30 | 22 | 4 | 4 | 68 | 15 | +53 | 70 | |
| 2 | Maccabi Haifa | 30 | 21 | 5 | 4 | 80 | 27 | +53 | 68 | |
| 3 | Hapoel Tel Aviv | 30 | 19 | 5 | 6 | 75 | 34 | +41 | 62 | |
| 4 | Beitar Nes Tubruk | 30 | 17 | 8 | 5 | 64 | 36 | +28 | 59 | |
| 5 | Hapoel Petah Tikva | 30 | 14 | 7 | 9 | 50 | 44 | +6 | 49 | |
| 6 | Maccabi Netanya | 30 | 12 | 6 | 12 | 57 | 45 | +12 | 42 | |
| 7 | Hapoel Haifa | 30 | 12 | 6 | 12 | 43 | 41 | +2 | 42 | |
| 8 | Bnei Yehuda | 30 | 10 | 9 | 11 | 61 | 52 | +9 | 39 | |
| 9 | Beitar Jerusalem | 29 | 10 | 9 | 10 | 28 | 27 | +1 | 39 | |
| 10 | F.C. Ashdod | 29 | 10 | 5 | 14 | 42 | 42 | 0 | 35 | |
| 11 | Hapoel Kfar Saba | 30 | 10 | 5 | 15 | 44 | 59 | −15 | 35 | |
| 12 | Maccabi Petah Tikva | 30 | 9 | 7 | 14 | 30 | 45 | −15 | 34 | |
| 13 | Maccabi Herzliya | 30 | 9 | 7 | 14 | 33 | 59 | −26 | 34 | |
| 14 | Ironi Rishon LeZion | 30 | 8 | 6 | 16 | 37 | 54 | −17 | 30 | |
| 15 | Hapoel Acre (R) | 30 | 6 | 5 | 19 | 22 | 84 | −62 | 23 | Relegation to Noar Arzit League |
| 16 | F.C. Neve Yosef (R) | 30 | 0 | 6 | 24 | 19 | 89 | −70 | 6 | Relegation to Noar Arzit League |

Source: one.co.il
Rules for classification: 1st points; 2nd goal difference; 3rd matches won; 4th goals scored; 5th head-to-head; 6th decision match
(C) Champions; (R) Relegated

2004–05 Noar Leumit League winners
Maccabi Tel Aviv
5th title
