= 2006–07 Israeli Noar Leumit League =

Israeli Noar Leumit League
- Season: 2006–07
- Matches played: 240
- Goals scored: 676 (2.82 per match)
- Top goalscorer: Hen Azriel; Mohamad Hatari; Omri Ron (15)

The 2006–07 Israeli Noar Leumit League was the 13th season since its introduction in 1994 as the top-tier football in Israel for teenagers between the ages 18–20.

Beitar Jerusalem won the title, whilst Hapoel Petah Tikva and Maccabi Herzliya were relegated. The relegated teams were replaced by Ironi Kiryat Shmona (promoted from Artzit North Division) and Hapoel Ashkelon (promoted from Artzit South Division).

== Final table ==
Pos	Team	Pld	W	D	L	GF	GA	GD	Pts	Qualification or relegation
1	Beitar Jerusalem (C)	30	24	3	3	69	18	+51	75	
2	Maccabi Petah Tikva	30	18	4	8	53	29	+24	58	
3	Hapoel Haifa	30	13	13	4	45	30	+15	52	
4	Maccabi Tel Aviv	30	16	4	10	46	36	+10	52	
5	Hapoel Tel Aviv	30	14	8	8	52	27	+25	50	
6	Maccabi Haifa	30	14	5	11	54	50	+4	47	
7	Beitar Nes Tubruk	30	11	12	7	48	32	+16	45	
8	Maccabi Netanya	30	11	11	8	43	37	+6	44	
9	Bnei Yehuda	30	10	9	11	45	42	+3	39	
10	Hapoel Nazareth Illit Jezre'el	30	10	6	14	39	48	−9	36	
11	Bnei Sakhnin	30	8	10	12	23	40	−17	34	
12	F.C. Ashdod	30	8	8	14	43	64	−21	32	
13	Ironi Rishon LeZion	30	7	8	15	36	56	−20	29	
14	Hapoel Be'er Sheva	30	8	3	19	33	70	−37	27	
15	Hapoel Petah Tikva (R)	30	4	8	18	22	54	−32	20	Relegation to Noar Arzit League
16	Maccabi Herzliya (R)	30	3	10	17	25	43	−18	19	Relegation to Noar Arzit League

Source: IFA (in Hebrew)
Rules for classification: 1st points; 2nd goal difference; 3rd matches won; 4th goals scored; 5th head-to-head; 6th decision match
(C) Champions; (R) Relegated

2006–07 Noar Leumit League winners
Beitar Jerusalem
1st title
