= 2019–20 Israeli Noar Premier League =

Israeli Noar Premier League
- Season: 2019–20
- Matches played: 183
- Goals scored: 471 (2.57 per match)
- Top goalscorer: Stav Nahmani (17)

The 2019–20 Israeli Noar Premier League is the twenty-eight season since its introduction in 1999 and the 80th season of top-tier football in Israel. The season began in August 2019. On 13 April 2020 the league was suspended indefinitely due to the coronavirus pandemic. Maccabi Haifa were awarded the championship following the cancellation of the 2019–20 season. It was also decided there will be no relegations.

== League table ==
Pos	Team	Pld	W	D	L	GF	GA	GD	Pts	Qualification or relegation
1	Maccabi Haifa (C, Q)	23	16	5	2	56	13	+43	53	Qualification to UEFA Youth League
2	Hapoel Tel Aviv	23	11	9	3	45	26	+19	42	
3	Maccabi Tel Aviv	22	10	8	4	37	22	+15	38	
4	Maccabi Petah Tikva	23	10	7	6	32	26	+6	37	
5	Maccabi Netanya	23	9	7	7	32	25	+7	34	
6	Hapoel Nir Ramat HaSharon	23	8	9	6	30	28	+2	33	
7	Hapoel Be'er Sheva	23	8	7	8	34	36	−2	31	
8	Ironi Kiryat Shmona	23	7	10	6	29	33	−4	31	
9	Hapoel Ra'anana	23	7	9	7	24	23	+1	30	
10	Hapoel Ramat Gan Givatayim	23	6	10	7	26	28	−2	28	
11	Beitar Jerusalem	22	7	6	9	22	26	−4	27	
12	Hapoel Rishon LeZion	23	7	4	12	24	31	−7	25	
13	Bnei Sakhnin	23	4	12	7	22	33	−11	24	
14	Beitar Nes Tubruk	23	7	3	13	20	39	−19	24	
15	Hapoel Nof HaGalil	23	5	6	12	21	39	−18	21	
16	Hapoel Hadera	23	2	6	15	17	43	−26	12	

Updated to match(es) played on 14 December 2019. Source: Noar Premier League IFA (in Hebrew)
Rules for classification: 1) points; 2) goal difference; 3) number of wins; 4) goals scored; 5) head to head; 6)deciding match.
(C) Champions; (Q) Qualified for the phase indicated
