= 1989 Lilian Cup =

1989 League Cup

Tournament details
- Country: Israel
- Dates: 11 October – 28 November 1989
- Teams: 4

Final positions
- Champions: Hapoel Petah Tikva
- Runner-up: Beitar Tel Aviv

Tournament statistics
- Matches played: 3
- Goals scored: 12 (4 per match)
- Top goal scorer(s): Rafi Cohen (2)

The 1989 Lilian Cup was the 8th and final season of the competition. The four top placed teams from the previous season took part in the competition.

The competition was held in as a straight knock-out competition, with the two top placed teams from the previous season being seeded. The semi-final was played on 11 October 1989 and the final on 28 November. For the first time since the competition began, no 3rd-place match was played.

The competition was won by Hapoel Petah Tikva, who defeated Beitar Tel Aviv 4–2 in the final.

== Results ==
=== Semi-finals ===
11 October 1989	Maccabi Haifa	2–4	Beitar Tel Aviv	Herzliya
	Atar 9'; Mordechai 67'	Report (in Hebrew)	Dely Valdés 40'; Cohen 43' (pen.); Edri 47'; Gal 64'	Stadium: Herzliya Municipal Stadium; Attendance: 500; Referee: Ya'akov Shiner

11 October 1989	Hapoel Petah Tikva	0–0 (Note: No extra time was played.) (4–3 p)	Maccabi Netanya	Herzliya
		Report (in Hebrew)		Stadium: Herzliya Municipal Stadium; Attendance: 500; Referee: Ovadia Ben Itzhak
	Penalties
	Kozoshvili (penalty scored); Hazan (penalty scored); Keisi (penalty scored); Shosani (penalty scored); Uda (penalty missed)		(penalty scored) Lam; (penalty missed) Davis; (penalty scored) Menachem; (penalty scored) Etzioni; (penalty missed) Halfon

=== Final ===
28 November 1989

Hapoel Petah Tikva	4–2	Beitar Tel Aviv
R. Cohen 26', 83'; Levy 61'; Yossi Shoshani 73'	Report; Report (in Hebrew)	N. Cohen 52' (pen.); Boahdana 65' (pen.)

Herzliya Municipal Stadium
Attendance: 1000
Referee: Tzvi Sharir
