= 2013–14 Israeli Noar Premier League =

Israeli Noar Premier League
- Season: 2013–14
- Matches played: 240
- Goals scored: 694 (2.89 per match)
- Top goalscorer: Dean David (20)

The 2013–14 Israeli Noar Premier League was the 20th season since its introduction in 1994 as the top-tier football in Israel for teenagers between the ages 18–20, and the 3rd under the name Noar Premier League.

Maccabi Haifa won the title, whilst Bnei Yehuda and Hapoel Ramat HaSharon were relegated.

== Final table ==
| Pos | Team | Pld | W | D | L | GF | GA | GD | Pts | Qualification or relegation |
|---|---|---|---|---|---|---|---|---|---|---|
| 1 | Maccabi Haifa (C) | 30 | 18 | 8 | 4 | 59 | 27 | +32 | 62 | |
| 2 | Maccabi Tel Aviv | 30 | 18 | 6 | 6 | 60 | 27 | +33 | 60 | |
| 3 | Maccabi Petah Tikva | 30 | 16 | 4 | 10 | 51 | 35 | +16 | 52 | |
| 4 | Beitar Nes Tubruk | 30 | 15 | 6 | 9 | 54 | 36 | +18 | 51 | |
| 5 | Ironi Kiryat Shmona | 30 | 14 | 7 | 9 | 49 | 36 | +13 | 49 | |
| 6 | Maccabi Netanya | 30 | 13 | 6 | 11 | 42 | 36 | +6 | 45 | |
| 7 | Hapoel Tel Aviv | 30 | 12 | 5 | 13 | 46 | 46 | 0 | 41 | |
| 8 | Hapoel Haifa | 30 | 11 | 8 | 11 | 44 | 44 | 0 | 41 | |
| 9 | Hapoel Be'er Sheva | 30 | 10 | 8 | 12 | 39 | 51 | −12 | 38 | |
| 10 | Hapoel Rishon LeZion | 30 | 10 | 7 | 13 | 36 | 46 | −10 | 37 | |
| 11 | F.C. Ashdod | 30 | 9 | 8 | 13 | 56 | 49 | +7 | 35 | |
| 12 | Beitar Jerusalem | 30 | 9 | 8 | 13 | 35 | 43 | −8 | 35 | |
| 13 | Hapoel Ra'anana | 30 | 9 | 8 | 13 | 33 | 49 | −16 | 35 | |
| 14 | Hapoel Ramat Gan | 30 | 9 | 7 | 14 | 31 | 40 | −9 | 34 | |
| 15 | Bnei Yehuda (R) | 30 | 9 | 7 | 14 | 34 | 58 | −24 | 34 | Relegation to Noar Leumit League |
| 16 | Hapoel Ramat HaSharon (R) | 30 | 3 | 7 | 20 | 25 | 71 | −46 | 16 | Relegation to Noar Leumit League |

Source: IFA (in Hebrew)
Rules for classification: 1st points; 2nd goal difference; 3rd matches won; 4th goals scored; 5th head-to-head; 6th decision match
(C) Champions; (R) Relegated

2013–14 Noar Leumit League winners
Maccabi Haifa
7th title
