= 2012–13 Israeli Noar Premier League =

Israeli Noar Premier League
- Season: 2012–13
- Matches played: 240
- Goals scored: 778 (3.24 per match)
- Top goalscorer: Shoval Gozlan (28)

The 2012–13 Israeli Noar Premier League was the 19th season since its introduction in 1994 as the top-tier football in Israel for teenagers between the ages 18–20, and the second under the name Noar Premier League.

Maccabi Haifa won the title, whilst Hapoel Kfar Saba and Hapoel Jerusalem were relegated.

== Final table ==
Pos	Team	Pld	W	D	L	GF	GA	GD	Pts	Qualification or relegation
1	Maccabi Haifa (C)	30	21	4	5	80	32	+48	67	
2	Maccabi Tel Aviv	30	21	3	6	66	28	+38	66	
3	Beitar Nes Tubruk	30	17	5	8	59	39	+20	56	
4	F.C. Ashdod	30	15	5	10	61	48	+13	50	
5	Maccabi Netanya	30	14	6	10	55	43	+12	48	
6	Ironi Kiryat Shmona	30	13	8	9	50	39	+11	47	
7	Hapoel Rishon LeZion	30	13	4	13	51	43	+8	43	
8	Bnei Yehuda	30	13	3	14	53	64	−11	42	
9	Hapoel Ramat HaSharon	30	12	6	12	42	55	−13	42	
10	Beitar Jerusalem	30	10	10	10	36	35	+1	40	
11	Hapoel Tel Aviv	30	11	5	14	38	35	+3	38	
12	Hapoel Haifa	30	11	5	14	58	58	0	38	
13	Maccabi Petah Tikva	30	9	9	12	40	46	−6	36	
14	Hapoel Be'er Sheva	30	8	6	16	38	64	−26	30	
15	Hapoel Kfar Saba (R)	30	6	6	18	30	58	−28	24	Relegation to Noar Leumit League
16	Hapoel Jerusalem (R)	30	1	5	24	21	91	−70	8	Relegation to Noar Leumit League

Source: IFA (in Hebrew)
Rules for classification: 1st points; 2nd goal difference; 3rd matches won; 4th goals scored; 5th head-to-head; 6th decision match
(C) Champions; (R) Relegated

2012–13 Noar Leumit League winners
Maccabi Haifa
6th title
