= 2020–21 Israeli Noar Premier League =

Israeli Noar Premier League
- Season: 2020–21

The 2020–21 Israeli Noar Premier League was the league's 29th season since its introduction in 1999 and the 81st season of top-tier football in Israel. The season began in August 2020. The previous season was suspended indefinitely on 13 April 2020 due to the coronavirus pandemic. Maccabi Haifa were awarded the championship following the cancellation of the 2019–20 season. It was also decided there would be no relegations. League play was stopped due to coronavirus and the 2021 Israel–Palestine crisis, and the league only completed 75% of its planned schedule.

== Format ==
All the 18 teams in the league will compete in single match in the end of the first stage the league will be divided to two parts 8 at Championship round and 10 at the Relegation round two teams on the relegation round will relegat to the Liga Leumit .

== League table ==
| Pos | Team | Pld | W | D | L | GF | GA | GD | Pts | Qualification or relegation |
|---|---|---|---|---|---|---|---|---|---|---|
| 1 | Maccabi Haifa | 17 | 15 | 1 | 1 | 42 | 14 | +28 | 46 | Qualification for the Championship round |
| 2 | Maccabi Petah Tikva | 17 | 12 | 2 | 3 | 29 | 8 | +21 | 38 | Qualification for the Championship round |
| 3 | Maccabi Tel Aviv | 17 | 10 | 2 | 5 | 27 | 20 | +7 | 32 | Qualification for the Championship round |
| 4 | F.C. Ashdod | 17 | 10 | 1 | 6 | 41 | 29 | +12 | 31 | Qualification for the Championship round |
| 5 | Hapoel Hadera | 17 | 9 | 2 | 6 | 27 | 19 | +8 | 29 | Qualification for the Championship round |
| 6 | Hapoel Tel Aviv | 17 | 7 | 6 | 4 | 22 | 17 | +5 | 27 | Qualification for the Championship round |
| 7 | Ironi Kiryat Shmona | 17 | 7 | 5 | 5 | 17 | 14 | +3 | 26 | Qualification for the Championship round |
| 8 | Hapoel Ramat Gan Givatayim | 17 | 7 | 2 | 8 | 25 | 21 | +4 | 23 | Qualification for the Championship round |
| 9 | Hapoel Be'er Sheva | 17 | 7 | 2 | 8 | 29 | 29 | 0 | 23 | Qualification for the Relegation round |
| 10 | Bnei Sakhnin | 17 | 6 | 4 | 7 | 17 | 25 | −8 | 22 | Qualification for the Relegation round |
| 11 | Hapoel Ra'anana | 17 | 5 | 5 | 7 | 14 | 17 | −3 | 20 | Qualification for the Relegation round |
| 12 | Hapoel Rishon LeZion | 17 | 4 | 6 | 7 | 18 | 19 | −1 | 18 | Qualification for the Relegation round |
| 13 | Maccabi Netanya | 17 | 3 | 9 | 5 | 19 | 23 | −4 | 18 | Qualification for the Relegation round |
| 14 | Ironi Nesher | 17 | 5 | 3 | 9 | 14 | 29 | −15 | 18 | Qualification for the Relegation round |
| 15 | Beitar Jerusalem | 17 | 3 | 6 | 8 | 9 | 22 | −13 | 15 | Qualification for the Relegation round |
| 16 | Beitar Nes Tubruk | 17 | 4 | 3 | 10 | 13 | 31 | −18 | 15 | Qualification for the Relegation round |
| 17 | Hapoel Nir Ramat HaSharon | 17 | 3 | 4 | 10 | 15 | 27 | −12 | 13 | Qualification for the Relegation round |
| 18 | Hapoel Nof HaGalil | 17 | 3 | 3 | 11 | 15 | 29 | −14 | 12 | Qualification for the Relegation round |

Updated to match(es) played on 30 August 2020. Source: Noar Premier League IFA (in Hebrew)
Rules for classification: 1) Points; 2) Goal difference; 3) Matches won; 4) Goals scored; 5) Head-to-head points; 6) Head-to-head goal difference; 7) Head-to-head goals scored; 8) Play-off.

=== Championship round ===
| Pos | Team | Pld | W | D | L | GF | GA | GD | Pts | Qualification or relegation |
|---|---|---|---|---|---|---|---|---|---|---|
| 1 | Maccabi Haifa (C, Q) | 20 | 18 | 1 | 1 | 52 | 16 | +36 | 55 | Qualification to UEFA Youth League |
| 2 | Maccabi Petah Tikva | 20 | 14 | 3 | 3 | 35 | 10 | +25 | 45 | |
| 3 | F.C. Ashdod | 20 | 12 | 1 | 7 | 46 | 35 | +11 | 37 | |
| 4 | Maccabi Tel Aviv | 20 | 11 | 3 | 6 | 31 | 22 | +9 | 36 | |
| 5 | Hapoel Hadera | 20 | 9 | 4 | 7 | 31 | 24 | +7 | 31 | |
| 6 | Hapoel Tel Aviv | 20 | 8 | 6 | 6 | 25 | 22 | +3 | 30 | |
| 7 | Ironi Kiryat Shmona | 20 | 8 | 5 | 7 | 21 | 21 | 0 | 29 | |
| 8 | Hapoel Ramat Gan Givatayim | 20 | 7 | 2 | 11 | 28 | 31 | −3 | 23 | |

Updated to match(es) played on 30 August 2020. Source: Noar Premier League IFA (in Hebrew)
Rules for classification: 1) Points; 2) Goal difference; 3) Matches won; 4) Goals scored; 5) Head-to-head points; 6) Head-to-head goal difference; 7) Head-to-head goals scored; 8) Play-off.
(C) Champions; (Q) Qualified for the phase indicated

=== Relegation round table ===
| Pos | Team | Pld | W | D | L | GF | GA | GD | Pts | Qualification or relegation |
|---|---|---|---|---|---|---|---|---|---|---|
| 9 | Bnei Sakhnin | 20 | 8 | 5 | 7 | 22 | 26 | −4 | 29 | |
| 10 | Hapoel Rishon LeZion | 20 | 6 | 7 | 7 | 22 | 19 | +3 | 25 | |
| 11 | Maccabi Netanya | 20 | 5 | 10 | 5 | 25 | 25 | 0 | 25 | |
| 12 | Hapoel Be'er Sheva | 20 | 7 | 3 | 10 | 31 | 34 | −3 | 24 | |
| 13 | Hapoel Ra'anana | 20 | 6 | 6 | 8 | 20 | 24 | −4 | 24 | |
| 14 | Ironi Nesher | 20 | 6 | 4 | 10 | 19 | 34 | −15 | 22 | |
| 15 | Beitar Jerusalem | 20 | 5 | 6 | 9 | 14 | 25 | −11 | 21 | |
| 16 | Beitar Nes Tubruk (Q) | 20 | 5 | 5 | 10 | 18 | 35 | −17 | 20 | Qualification for the Relegation play-offs |
| 17 | Hapoel Nir Ramat HaSharon (R) | 20 | 3 | 4 | 13 | 17 | 34 | −17 | 13 | Relegation to Noar Leumit League |
| 18 | Hapoel Nof HaGalil (R) | 20 | 3 | 3 | 14 | 17 | 37 | −20 | 12 | Relegation to Noar Leumit League |

Updated to match(es) played on unknown. Source: Noar Premier League IFA (in Hebrew)
Rules for classification: 1) Points; 2) Goal difference; 3) Matches won; 4) Goals scored; 5) Head-to-head points; 6) Head-to-head goal difference; 7) Head-to-head goals scored; 8) Play-off.
(Q) Qualified for the phase indicated; (R) Relegated

== Promotion play-offs ==
In the first round of the play-offs the second-placed team from Each district from the second League will face in a single match on neutral ground in the second round the winner of the match will face the 16th-placed team in a neutral ground.

=== First round ===
10 June 2021

| Hapoel Haifa | 0-2 | Sektzia Nes Tziona |

Ramat Gan Stadium

=== Second round ===
15 June 2021

| Beitar Nes Tubruk | 1-1 (a.e.t.) | Sektzia Nes Tziona |
Penalties
| | 2–4 |

Ramat Gan Stadium
