= 1948–49 Israel Youth State Cup =

Tournament details
- Country: Israel
- Teams: 14

Final positions
- Champions: Maccabi Avraham Tel Aviv
- Runners-up: Maccabi Ramat Gan

Tournament statistics
- Matches played: 13
- Goals scored: 44 (3.38 per match)

The 1948–49 Israel Youth State Cup (Hebrew: גביע המדינה, Gvia HaMedina) was the first season of Israeli Football Association's nationwide football cup competition for youth footballers.

14 teams registered to play for the cup and the competition began of 30 October 1948. In the final, played at Hapoel Tel Aviv's Basa Stadium, Maccabi Avraham Tel Aviv defeated Maccabi Ramat Gan 3–0.

== Results ==
=== First round ===
Home team	Score	Away team
Matches played on 30 October 1948
Hapoel Ra'anana	6–0	Hapoel Tel Aviv
Maccabi Avraham Tel Aviv	8–0	Hapoel Hadera
Maccabi Petah Tikva	3–1	Maccabi Haifa
Hapoel Petah Tikva	2–0	Hakoah Tel Aviv
Matches played on 6 November 1948
Hapoel Ramat Gan	1–2	HaShachar Israel
HaShachar Nissim	3–0	Beitar Tel Aviv
Maccabi Ramat Gan	w/o (Note: Maccabi Menachem originally won the match 2–1.)	Maccabi Menachem Tel Aviv

=== Quarter-finals ===
As 7 clubs progressed to the quarter-finals, one club, Maccabi Ramat Gan received a bye to the semi-finals. The quarter-finals were played on 19 November 1948.

Home team	Score	Away team
Hapoel Ra'anana	2–1	HaShachar Israel
Maccabi Avraham Tel Aviv	1–0	Hapoel Petah Tikva
Maccabi Petah Tikva	3–1	HaShachar Nissim

=== Semi-finals ===
Due to weather conditions, the semi-final matches were delayed until 8 January 1949. Both matches were played at Basa Stadium.

Home team	Score	Away team
Hapoel Ra'anana	0–3	Maccabi Ramat Gan
Maccabi Avraham Tel Aviv	1–0	Maccabi Petah Tikva

=== Final ===
19 February 1949

Maccabi Avraham Tel Aviv	3–0	Maccabi Ramat Gan

Basa Stadium, Tel Aviv
