= 1943–44 Palestine Noar League =

The 1943–44 Palestine Youth League was the second season since its introduction in 1941–42.

Although league matches weren't completed, the EIFA declared Maccabi Michael Tel Aviv as champions, as no other team could overtake them.

== Final table ==
Pos	Team	Pld	W	D	L	GF	GA	GR	Pts	Qualification or relegation
1	Maccabi Michael Tel Aviv	15	14	1	0	65	4	16.250	29	Champions
2	Hapoel Petah Tikva	16	11	1	4	30	18	1.667	23	
3	Maccabi Eliezer Tel Aviv	17	6	3	8	22	26	0.846	15	
4	Hapoel Ramat Gan	17	7	1	9	18	26	0.692	15	
5	Maccabi Ramat Gan	17	7	1	9	23	38	0.605	15	
6	Bnei Yehuda A	15	7	0	8	22	31	0.710	14	
7	Bnei Yehuda B	17	6	2	9	21	36	0.583	14	
8	Maccabi Galim Tel Aviv	16	6	2	8	13	25	0.520	14	
9	Hakoah Tel Aviv	15	6	1	8	21	17	1.235	13	
10	Hapoel Tel Aviv	17	5	0	12	16	30	0.533	10	

Updated to match(es) played on 25 June 1944. Source: Memo no. 23, p. 3 IFA (in Hebrew)
