= Avraham Luzon =

Israeli football executive (born 1955)

Avraham Luzon (Hebrew: אבי לוזון; born 24 April 1955) is an Israeli football executive.

Luzon has been a member of the UEFA Executive Committee since 2009 and currently also is the Chairman of the UEFA Media Committee. Until July 2014 he held several positions with the Israel Football Association (IFA). Prior to this, he was a bank manager and chairman of his hometown club Maccabi Petah Tikva FC.
