= Israeli Noar Premier League =

- Founded: 1994; 32 years ago
- Country: Israel
- Confederation: UEFA
- Number of clubs: 18
- Level on pyramid: 1 (for youth leagues)
- Relegation to: Israeli Noar Leumit League
- Domestic cup: Israel Youth State Cup
- Current champions: Maccabi Petah Tikva (2) (2023–24)
- Most championships: Maccabi Haifa (10 titles)
- Website: http://football.org.il
- Current: 2023–24 Israeli Noar Premier League

The Israeli Noar Premier League (Hebrew: ליגת העל לנוער, Ligat Ha'al LeNoar, lit. Youth Super League) is the top division in the Israeli football league system for teenagers between the ages 18–20. From 1994 to 2011, it was called Israeli Noar Leumit League. The league is a continuation of the previous youth league system, established in 1941.

== History ==
A youth football league was established during the British mandate in 1941, and was played for three seasons. The league resumed for the 1947–48 season, during which the state of Israel was established, and the league was partly finished afterwards.

Following the establishment of Israel, the league was reorganized, and was divided into regional divisions, with the champions of each division playing a championship play-off to determine the nationwide champions. In 1982, the IFA decided to form a nationwide division, at the top of the league system, called Liga Leumit (similar to the seniors' top division). In 1994, the IFA re-established the league as the Liga Illit (Hebrew: ליגה עילית, lit. Super League).

== Number of foreigners ==
Teams are limited to two foreign players per team. Special circumstances such as Druze players from the Golan with no citizenship, such as Weaam Amasha. Another case includes that of Toto Tamuz, who did not have full Israeli citizenship, do not count against the foreign player limit.

== Current Noar Premier League clubs ==
The following clubs are participating in the 2024–25 season:

- Bnei Yehuda Tel Aviv
- Beitar Nes Tubruk
- Bnei Sakhnin
- F.C. Ashdod
- Hapoel Be'er Sheva
- Hapeol Haifa
- Hapoel Hadera
- Hapoel Kfar Saba
- Hapoel Nir Ramat HaSharon
- Hapoel Petah Tikva
- Hapoel Ra'anana
- Hapoel Rishon LeZion
- Hapoel Tel Aviv
- Ironi Kiryat Shmona
- Maccabi Haifa
- Maccabi Netanya
- Maccabi Petah Tikva
- Maccabi Tel Aviv

== Champions ==
Season	Champions
Pre-Independence
1941–42	Maccabi Tel Aviv
1943–44	Maccabi Tel Aviv
1944–45	Hapoel Tel Aviv
1947–48	Maccabi Tel Aviv
Regional Leagues
1954–55	Maccabi Tel Aviv
1955–56	Hapoel Haifa
1956–57	Hapoel Jerusalem
1957–58	Maccabi Tel Aviv
1958–59	Gadna Oded; Gadna Yehuda; Hapoel Haifa; Hapoel Jerusalem; Maccabi Tel Aviv ^{1}
1959–60	Gadna Yehuda
1960–61	Maccabi Tel Aviv
1961–62	Maccabi Tel Aviv
1962–63	Maccabi Tel Aviv
1963–64	Maccabi Tel Aviv
1964–65	Gadna Yehuda
1965–66	Hapoel Tel Aviv
1966–67	Maccabi Netanya
1967–68	Maccabi Netanya
1968–69	Hapoel Be'er Sheva
1969–70	Shimshon Tel Aviv
1970–71	Maccabi Netanya
1971–72	Beitar Jerusalem
1972–73	Maccabi Netanya
1973–74	Hapoel Be'er Sheva
1974–75	Maccabi Haifa
1975–76	Hapoel Be'er Sheva
1976–77	Hapoel Ramat Gan
1977–78	Hapoel Tel Aviv
1978–79	Maccabi Haifa
1979–80	Maccabi Netanya; Hapoel Petah Tikva; Beitar Jerusalem ^{1}
1980–81	Maccabi Haifa; Hapoel Tel Aviv; Beitar Jerusalem ^{1}
1981–82	Hapoel Jerusalem

Season	Champions
Liga Illit
1982–83	Maccabi Tel Aviv
1983–84	Maccabi Haifa
1984–85	Maccabi Haifa
1985–86	Hapoel Petah Tikva
1986–87	Hapoel Be'er Sheva
1987–88	Maccabi Tel Aviv
1988–89	Bnei Yehuda
1989–90	Hapoel Tel Aviv
1990–91	Maccabi Haifa
1991–92	Maccabi Tel Aviv
1992–93	Maccabi Tel Aviv
1993–94	Hapoel Kfar Saba
Israeli Leumit Noar League
1994–95	Maccabi Netanya
1995–96	Maccabi Tel Aviv
1996–97	Maccabi Tel Aviv
1997–98	Gadna Tel Aviv Yehuda
1998–99	Maccabi Haifa
1999–2000	Hapoel Petah Tikva
2000–01	Maccabi Tel Aviv
2001–02	Maccabi Tel Aviv
2002–03	Maccabi Haifa
2003–04	Maccabi Haifa
2004–05	Maccabi Tel Aviv
2005–06	Hapoel Haifa
2006–07	Beitar Jerusalem
2007–08	Beitar Jerusalem
2008–09	Maccabi Haifa
2009–10	Maccabi Haifa
2010–11	Maccabi Tel Aviv
Israeli Premier Noar League
2011–12	Maccabi Tel Aviv
2012–13	Maccabi Haifa
2013–14	Maccabi Haifa
2014–15	Maccabi Tel Aviv
2015–16	Maccabi Haifa
2016–17	Maccabi Haifa
2017–18	Maccabi Tel Aviv
2018–19	Maccabi Petah Tikva
2019–20	Maccabi Haifa
2020–21	Maccabi Haifa
2021–22	F.C. Ashdod
2022–23	Maccabi Haifa
2023–24	Maccabi Petah Tikva
2024–25	Maccabi Haifa

^{1} No playoff was played.

=== Total championships (from 1994) ===
Rank	Club	Titles	Winning seasons
1	Maccabi Haifa	13	1998–1999, 2002–2003, 2003–2004, 2008–2009, 2009–2010, 2012–2013, 2013–2014, 2015-2016, 2016-2017, 2019-2020, 2020-2021, 2022-2023, 2024-2025
2	Maccabi Tel Aviv	9	1995–1996, 1996–1997, 2000–2001, 2001–2002, 2004–2005, 2010–2011, 2011–2012, 2014-2015, 2017-2018
3	Beitar Jerusalem	2	2006–2007, 2007–2008
-	Maccabi Petah Tikva	2	2018-2019, 2023-2024
4	Maccabi Netanya	1	1994–1995
-	Gadna Tel Aviv Yehuda	1	1997–1998
-	Hapoel Petah Tikva	1	1999–2000
-	Hapoel Haifa	1	2005–2006
-	MS Ashdod	1	2021-2022
