= 1987 Lilian Cup =

1987 League Cup

Tournament details
- Country: Israel
- Dates: 29 August – 1 September 1987
- Teams: 4

Final positions
- Champions: Maccabi Tel Aviv
- Runner-up: Bnei Yehuda

Tournament statistics
- Matches played: 4
- Goals scored: 11 (2.75 per match)
- Top goal scorer(s): Benny Smadja (H. Lod) (3)

The 1987 Lilian Cup was the 6th season of the competition. The four top placed teams for the previous season took part in the competition.

The competition was played as a straight knock-out competition and held between 29 August and 1 September 1987.

The competition was won by Maccabi Tel Aviv, who had beaten Bnei Yehuda 2–0 in the final.

== Results ==
=== Semi-finals ===
29 August 1987	Beitar Jerusalem	0–2	Maccabi Tel Aviv	Ramat Gan
			Tabak 23'; Shimonov 26'	Stadium: Ramat Gan Stadium

29 August 1987	Bnei Yehuda	1–1 (a.e.t.) (5–3 p)	Hapoel Lod	Ramat Gan
	Gordana 70'		Smadja 14'	Stadium: Ramat Gan Stadium; Attendance: 400; Referee: Yehoshua Loya
	Penalties
	Alu (penalty scored); Salman (penalty scored); Levy (penalty scored); Maman (penalty scored); Gordana (penalty scored)		(penalty scored) Benodis; (penalty scored) Maya; (penalty scored) Sharvit; (penalty missed) Hillel

=== 3rd-4th Place Match ===
1 September 1987

Hapoel Lod	3–2	Beitar Jerusalem
Smadja 26', 65' (pen.); Sharvit 50'		Mizrahi 15' (pen.); Dido 35'

Ramat Gan Stadium
Attendance: 250
Referee: Ovadia Ben Itzhak

=== Final ===
1 September 1987

Maccabi Tel Aviv	2–0	Bnei Yehuda
Levy 47'; Goldberg 80' (pen.)

Ramat Gan Stadium
Attendance: 2000
Referee: Arie Prost
