= Lilian Cup =

Lilian Cup Israeli League Cup
- Founded: 1982
- Abolished: 1989
- Region: Israel
- Teams: 4
- Last champions: Hapoel Petah Tikva (1989–90)
- Most championships: Maccabi Netanya; Maccabi Tel Aviv (2 titles)

The Lililan Cup (Hebrew: גביע ליליאן, Gvia Lililan), which was also known as The League Cup (Hebrew: גביע הליגה, Gvia HaLiga) was an Israeli men's football competition open to the top 4 clubs in Liga Leumit between 1981–82 and 1988–89. The competition was contested at the start of each football season. It was cancelled after the 1989 tournament.

== History ==
The competition was established in 1982, as a season opening tournament, and was named after Yehuda Lilian, a former IFA treasurer and Hapoel member, who died in February 1982.

Parallel to this competition the IFA also held the Israel Super Cup, which was played at the end of the season, and the Toto Cup, which was played throughout the season, mostly on weekdays.

Due to dwindling interest in the competition, and the preference to give more weight to hold most of the Toto Cup matches before the beginning of the league season, the cup was cancelled in 1989.

== Format ==
The format of the competition varied during its years between a straight knock-out competition, held in two match days, and between a preliminary group, played as a single round-robin tournament, followed by a third place match and final.

== Results ==
Year	Final			Third Place Match		
Year	Champions	Score	Runners-Up	Third Place	Score	Fourth Place
1982	Maccabi Netanya	3–1	Hapoel Be'er Sheva	Hapoel Kfar Saba	2–0	Bnei Yehuda
1983	Maccabi Netanya	3–2	Hapoel Be'er Sheva	Hapoel Tel Aviv	2–1	Shimshon Tel Aviv
1984	Maccabi Haifa	5–4	Hapoel Tel Aviv	Maccabi Netanya	1–0	Beitar Jerusalem
1985	Beitar Jerusalem	3–1	Maccabi Petah Tikva	Maccabi Haifa	3–0	Shimshon Tel Aviv
1986	Maccabi Tel Aviv	2–1	Maccabi Haifa	Hapoel Tel Aviv	1–0	Beitar Jerusalem
1987	Maccabi Tel Aviv	2–0	Bnei Yehuda	Hapoel Lod	3–2	Beitar Jerusalem
1988	Hapoel Be'er Sheva	1–0	Hapoel Tel Aviv	Shimshon Tel Aviv	3–2	Maccabi Netanya
1989	Hapoel Petah Tikva	4–2	Beitar Tel Aviv	Maccabi Netanya; Maccabi Haifa	^{1}	

1. Third place match wasn't played.

^{Source:}

=== Performance by club ===
Team	Participations	Winners	Runners-up	Third-place	Fourth-place
Maccabi Netanya	5	2	–	1	1
Maccabi Tel Aviv	2	2	–	–	–
Hapoel Be'er Sheva	3	1	2	–	–
Maccabi Haifa	4	1	1	2	–
Beitar Jerusalem	4	1	–	–	3
Hapoel Petah Tikva	1	1	–	–	–
Hapoel Tel Aviv	4	–	2	2	–
Bnei Yehuda	2	–	1	–	1
Maccabi Petah Tikva	1	–	1	–	–
Beitar Tel Aviv	1	–	1	–	–
Shimshon Tel Aviv	3	–	–	1	2
Hapoel Kfar Saba	1	–	–	1	–
Hapoel Lod	1	–	–	1	–
