= 2021–22 Israeli Noar Premier League =

Israeli football season

Israeli Noar Premier League
- Season: 2021–22

The 2021–22 Israeli Noar Premier League is the thirty season since its introduction in 1999 and the 82nd season of top-tier football in Israel for under-19. The season began in 21 August 2021. the previous season which was extended for the summer due coronavirus pandemic and then was stopped due 2021 Israel–Palestine crisis was suspended after be completed 75% of the games. Maccabi Haifa were awarded the championship.

== Format ==
All the 18 teams in the league will compete in against each other home-and-away in a round-robin format. The last four teams were relegated to the second division .

== League table ==
Pos	Team	Pld	W	D	L	GF	GA	GD	Pts	Qualification or relegation
1	F.C. Ashdod	5	4	1	0	16	1	+15	13	Qualification to UEFA Youth League
2	Maccabi Haifa	5	4	1	0	11	1	+10	13	
3	Maccabi Tel Aviv	5	4	1	0	10	2	+8	13	
4	Hapoel Ra'anana	5	3	2	0	5	2	+3	11	
5	Hapoel Tel Aviv	5	3	1	1	9	6	+3	10	
6	Hapoel Be'er Sheva	5	3	1	1	7	7	0	10	
7	Hapoel Ramat Gan Givatayim	5	3	0	2	7	6	+1	9	
8	Maccabi Petah Tikva	5	2	2	1	13	8	+5	8	
9	Hapoel Hadera	5	2	1	2	5	7	−2	7	
10	Ironi Kiryat Shmona	5	2	1	2	6	6	0	7	
11	Hapoel Rishon LeZion	5	2	0	3	10	10	0	6	
12	Sektzia Nes Tziona	5	2	0	3	8	8	0	6	
13	Maccabi Netanya	5	1	1	3	6	7	−1	4	
14	Hapoel Kfar Saba	5	1	1	3	2	8	−6	4	
15	Beitar Jerusalem	5	1	0	4	4	10	−6	3	Relegation to Noar Leumit League
16	Bnei Yehuda Tel Aviv	5	1	0	4	3	14	−11	3	Relegation to Noar Leumit League
17	Ironi Nesher	5	0	1	4	4	11	−7	1	Relegation to Noar Leumit League
18	Bnei Sakhnin	5	0	0	5	5	17	−12	0	Relegation to Noar Leumit League

Updated to match(es) played on 24 September 2021. Source: Noar Premier League IFA
Rules for classification: 1) Points; 2) Goal difference; 3) Matches won; 4) Goals scored; 5) Head-to-head points; 6) Head-to-head goal difference; 7) Head-to-head goals scored; 8) Play-off.
