= Nissan Cohen =

Israeli footballer

Personal information
- Full name: Nissan Cohen
- Date of birth: May 8, 1963 (age 63)
- Place of birth: Israel
- Position: Midfielder

Youth career
- Beitar Tel Aviv

Senior career*
Years	Team	Apps	(Gls)
1983–1992	Beitar Tel Aviv		
1985–1986	→ Bnei Yehuda (loan)		
1992–1995	Maccabi Herzliya		
1995–1996	Beitar Tel Aviv		
2001–2002	Maccabi HaShikma Ramat Hen		
2002–2003	Hapoel Kiryat Ono		
2003–2005	Maccabi HaShikma Ramat Hen		

International career
1988	Israel	1	(0)
- * Club domestic league appearances and goals

Nissan Cohen (born May 8, 1963) is a former Israeli footballer who played for Beitar Tel Aviv in Israeli top division.

== Career ==
Cohen started his career with Beitar Tel Aviv after graduating from its youth system, and was part of the team of midfielders nicknamed "The Three Cohens", along with Nissim Cohen and Yaron Cohen, who took the team to 3rd place (in 1991), its best placing since 1945.

In 1992, Cohen left Beitar Tel Aviv and joined Maccabi Herzliya, along with Nissim Cohen, and won Liga Artzit in his first season with the club. In 1995, Cohen returned to Beitar Tel Aviv for a final season with the club, after which Cohen played for several minor clubs, such as Maccabi Hashikma Ramat Hen, with which he won Liga Bet, and Hapoel Kiryat Ono.

Cohen made one appearance with the national team, against Romania.

== Honours ==
- Israeli Second Division:
  - 1992–93
- Israel Fifth Division:
  - 2001–02
