= 1985 Lilian Cup =

1985 League Cup

Tournament details
- Country: Israel
- Dates: 31 August–10 September 1985
- Teams: 4

Final positions
- Champions: Beitar Jerusalem
- Runner-up: Maccabi Petah Tikva

Tournament statistics
- Matches played: 8
- Goals scored: 26 (3.25 per match)
- Top goal scorer(s): Asher Sasson (B. Jer.) (5)

The 1985 Lilian Cup was the 4th season of the competition. The four top placed teams for the previous season took part in the competition.

The competition was held in two stages. First, the four teams played a round-robin tournament, after which the two top teams played for the cup, while the bottom teams played for the third place. The competition was held between 31 August and 10 September 1985.

The competition was won by Beitar Jerusalem, who had beaten Maccabi Petah Tikva 3–1 in the final.

== Group stage ==
The matches were played from 31 August to 7 September 1985.

Pos	Team	Pld	W	D	L	GF	GA	GD	Pts	Qualification or relegation
1	Beitar Jerusalem	3	3	0	0	11	1	+10	6	Final
2	Maccabi Petah Tikva	3	1	1	1	5	9	−4	3	Final
3	Shimshon Tel Aviv	3	0	2	1	3	6	−3	2	3rd place match
4	Maccabi Haifa	3	0	1	2	0	3	−3	1	3rd place match

Updated to match(es) played on 7 September 1985. Source:

31 August 1985 Round 1	Beitar Jerusalem	3–0	Shimshon Tel Aviv	Ramat Gan
	Sasson 20', 88'; Azulai 82'			Stadium: Winter Stadium; Attendance: 250; Referee: Ovadia Tzvi

31 August 1985 Round 1	Maccabi Petah Tikva	1–0	Maccabi Haifa	Ramat Gan
	Eliasfor 4'			Stadium: Winter Stadium; Attendance: 400; Referee: Itzhak Ben Itzhak

4 September 1985 Round 2	Maccabi Haifa	0–2	Beitar Jerusalem
			Cohen 32'; Sasson 53'

4 September 1985 Round 2	Maccabi Petah Tikva	3–3	Shimshon Tel Aviv
	Begbleiter 74'; Sandru 81'; Alon 90'		Shukrun 23'; Peretz 75'; Shalom 82'	Referee: Rachamim Dinachi

7 September 1985 Round 3	Shimshon Tel Aviv	0–0	Maccabi Haifa	Ramat Gan
				Stadium: Winter Stadium; Attendance: 300; Referee: Arie Prost

7 September 1985 Round 3	Beitar Jerusalem	6–1	Maccabi Petah Tikva	Ramat Gan
	Sasson 24'; Azulai 32', 63'; Golder 41'; Shirazi 77'; Schweig 78'		Ben Shitrit 76'	Stadium: Winter Stadium; Attendance: 600; Referee: Ovadia Ben Itzhka

== Final stage ==
=== 3rd-4th Place Match ===
10 September 1985

Shimshon Tel Aviv	0–3	Maccabi Haifa
		Armeli 51', 80' (pen.); Rosenthal 63'

Kiryat Eliezer Stadium
Attendance: 1000
Referee: Moshe Ashkenazi

=== Final ===
10 September 1985

Beitar Jerusalem	3–1 (a.e.t.)	Maccabi Petah Tikva
Sasson 4', 111'; Azulai 104'		Cohen 14'

Kiryat Eliezer Stadium
Attendance: 1000
Referee: Tzvi Sharir
