= 2015–16 Israeli Noar Premier League =

Israeli Noar Premier League
- Season: 2015–16
- Matches played: 215
- Goals scored: 595 (2.77 per match)
- Top goalscorer: Mohammed Awaed (30)

The 2015–16 Israeli Noar Premier League was the 21st season since its introduction in 1994 as the top-tier football in Israel for teenagers between the ages 18–20, and the 5th under the name Noar Premier League.

== League table ==
Pos	Team	Pld	W	D	L	GF	GA	GD	Pts	Qualification or relegation
1	Maccabi Haifa (C, Q)	30	22	4	4	71	21	+50	70	Qualification to UEFA Youth League Domestic
2	Maccabi Tel Aviv	30	16	4	10	36	31	+5	52	
3	Ironi Kiryat Shmona	30	13	11	6	52	31	+21	50	
4	Hapoel Tel Aviv	30	13	8	9	49	36	+13	47	
5	Hapoel Ra'anana	30	12	11	7	44	31	+13	47	
6	Hapoel Be'er Sheva	30	12	10	8	46	39	+7	46	
7	Bnei Sakhnin	30	11	10	9	51	38	+13	43	
8	Beitar Nes Tubruk	30	11	9	10	32	33	−1	42	
9	Bnei Yehuda	30	11	7	12	44	44	0	40	
10	Hapoel Haifa	30	11	6	13	42	45	−3	39	
11	Hapoel Rishon LeZion	30	10	9	11	36	41	−5	39	
12	F.C. Ashdod	30	10	7	13	41	45	−4	37	
13	Maccabi Netanya	30	8	11	11	38	40	−2	35	
14	Maccabi Petah Tikva	30	9	8	13	45	50	−5	35	Relegation play-offs
15	Beitar Jerusalem (R)	30	6	5	19	23	57	−34	23	Relegation to Noar Leumit League
16	Sektzia Nes Tziona (R)	30	2	6	22	23	91	−68	12	Relegation to Noar Leumit League

Source: IFA (in Hebrew)
Rules for classification: 1st points; 2nd goal difference; 3rd matches won; 4th goals scored; 5th head-to-head; 6th decision match
(C) Champions; (Q) Qualified for the phase indicated; (R) Relegated
