= 2016–17 Israeli Noar Premier League =

Israeli Noar Premier League
- Season: 2016-17
- Goals scored: Osama Khalaila (24)

The 2016–17 Israeli Noar Premier League was the 23rd season since its introduction in 1994 as the top-tier football in Israel for teenagers between the ages 18–20, and the 6th under the name Noar Premier League.

== League table ==
Pos	Team	Pld	W	D	L	GF	GA	GD	Pts	Qualification or relegation
1	Maccabi Haifa (C, Q)	26	20	3	3	48	12	+36	63	Qualification to UEFA Youth League Domestic Path
2	Hapoel Ra'anana	27	15	8	4	36	28	+8	53	
3	Maccabi Tel Aviv	26	15	4	7	43	20	+23	49	
4	Maccabi Petah Tikva	26	12	6	8	57	29	+28	42	
5	Ironi Kiryat Shmona	26	11	8	7	39	23	+16	41	
6	Bnei Sakhnin	27	10	8	9	54	44	+10	38	
7	Bnei Yehuda	26	11	3	12	32	39	−7	36	
8	Hapoel Tel Aviv	26	8	11	7	33	31	+2	35	
9	Maccabi Netanya	26	8	11	7	45	36	+9	35	
10	Hapoel Nir Ramat HaSharon	25	8	10	7	41	31	+10	34	
11	Hapoel Be'er Sheva	26	9	7	10	31	34	−3	34	
12	Hapoel Rishon LeZion	26	8	7	11	31	39	−8	31	
13	F.C. Ashdod	26	6	6	14	21	46	−25	24	
14	Beitar Nes Tubruk	26	4	10	12	22	40	−18	22	Relegation play-offs
15	Hapoel Ashkelon	26	6	1	19	22	69	−47	19	Relegation to Noar Leumit League
16	Hapoel Haifa	26	4	5	17	20	41	−21	17	Relegation to Noar Leumit League

Source: (in Hebrew)
Rules for classification: 1st points; 2nd goal difference; 3rd matches won; 4th goals scored; 5th head-to-head; 6th decision match
(C) Champions; (Q) Qualified for the phase indicated
