= Mor Shushan =

Israeli footballer

Mor Shushan מור שושן
Personal information
- Full name: Mor Shushan
- Date of birth: 4 November 1988 (age 38)
- Place of birth: Haifa, Israel
- Height: 1.83 m (6 ft 0 in)
- Position: Centre back

Team information
- Current team: Hapoel Bnei Lod

Youth career
- F.C. Neve Yosef
- Hapoel Nazareth Illit

Senior career*
Years	Team	Apps	(Gls)
2008–2010	Hapoel Nazareth Illit	44	(3)
2010–2013	Hapoel Tel Aviv	24	(0)
2010–2011	→ Maccabi Herzliya (loan)	28	(1)
2013–2014	Bnei Sakhnin	15	(1)
2014–2015	Hapoel Bnei Lod	13	(1)
- * Club domestic league appearances and goals as of 17 May 2014

Mor Shushan (Hebrew: מור שושן; born 4 November 1988) is a former Israeli footballer. Mor is the brother of Ron Shushan who plays as a goalkeeper.
