= Idan Sade =

Israeli footballer

Idan Sade עידן שדה
Personal information
- Full name: Idan Sade
- Date of birth: 8 May 1988 (age 38)
- Place of birth: Ashdod, Israel
- Height: 5 ft 11 in (1.80 m)
- Position: Midfielder

Team information
- Current team: Hapoel Ashdod

Youth career
- F.C. Ashdod

Senior career*
Years	Team	Apps	(Gls)
2007–2012	F.C. Ashdod	73	(4)
2012	→ Enosis Neon Paralimni (loan)	11	(1)
2012–2013	Hapoel Bnei Lod	16	(0)
2013	Hapoel Kfar Saba	9	(1)
2013–2014	Hapoel Jerusalem	29	(10)
2014	Maccabi Kiryat Gat	0	(0)
2014–2015	Hapoel Ashkelon	5	(1)
2015	Hakoah Amidar Ramat Gan	8	(1)
2015–2016	Hapoel Bnei Ashdod	25	(28)

International career
2010	Israel U-21	1	(0)
- * Club domestic league appearances and goals as of 1 June 2016

Idan Sade (Hebrew: עידן שדה; born 8 May 1988) is an Israeli footballer who plays for Hapoel Ashdod.
