= Nissim Cohen =

Israeli footballer

Nissim Cohen ניסים כהן
Personal information
- Full name: Nissim Cohen
- Date of birth: April 7, 1955 (age 71)
- Place of birth: Herzliya, Israel
- Position: Midfielder

Youth career
- Maccabi Herzliya

Senior career*
Years	Team	Apps	(Gls)
1972–1979	Maccabi Herzliya	167	(23)
1979–1983	Maccabi Petah Tikva	105	(16)
1983–1992	Beitar Tel Aviv	222	(47)
1985–1986	Bnei Yehuda (loan)	20	(4)
1992–1994	Maccabi Herzliya	66	(8)
1994–1995	Hapoel Bat Yam	23	(6)
1995–1996	Maccabi Herzliya	28	(2)
1996–1997	Bnei Yehuda	19	(0)
1997–1999	Maccabi Jaffa	43	(3)
1999–2000	Hapoel Ashkelon	2	(0)
2000–2001	Maccabi Ramat Amidar	9	(0)

International career
1980–1986	Israel	18	(2)
- * Club domestic league appearances and goals

Nissim Cohen (Hebrew: ניסים כהן) is a former Israeli footballer who is most notable for playing in the Israeli Premier League until he was 44 years old.

== Honours ==
- Israeli Second Division:
  - 1992-93, 1997-98
- Toto Cup:
  - 1996-97
