= Hapoel Bu'eine F.C. =

Israeli football club

Hapoel Bu'eine
- Full name: Hapoel Bu'eine Football Club הפועל בועיינה هبوعيل البعينة
- Founded: 2014
- Ground: Bi'ina
- Chairman: Imad Hamudi
- Manager: Shadi Hamodi
- League: Liga Alef North
- 2024–25: Liga Alef North, 12th of 16
Home colours	Away colours

Hapoel Bu'eine (Hebrew: הפועל בועיינה Arabic: هبوعيل البعينة) is an Israeli football club based in Bu'eine Nujeidat. The club is currently in Liga Alef North A division.

== History ==
The club played in the lower divisions of Israeli football from the 1960s and enjoyed a brief spell in Liga Bet, then fourth tier, between 1993–94 and 1998–99, before relegating back to Liga Gimel and folding. The club was re-established in 2010 and was promoted to Liga Bet in 2013. In 2015–16 finished second in its division and qualified to the promotion play-offs, advancing to the regional finals to Hapoel Umm al-Fahm.

== Honours ==
=== League ===
Honour	No.	Years
Fifth tier	2	1992–93, 2012–13
Sixth tier	1	1977–78
