= Ihud Bnei Baqa F.C. =

Israeli football club

Ihud Bnei Baqa
- Full name: Ihud Bnei Baqa Football Club איחוד בני בקה
- Founded: 2005
- Ground: Baqa al-Gharbiyye Ground, Baqa al-Gharbiyye
- Chairman: Hassan Mwassi
- Manager: Hussein Agbaria
- League: Liga Bet North B
- 2024–25: Liga Bet North B, 3rd
Home colours	Away colours

Ihud Bnei Baqa (Hebrew: איחוד בני בקה) is an Israeli football club based in Baqa al-Gharbiyye. The club currently plays in Liga Bet North B division.

== History ==
The club was founded in 2005, and started at Liga Gimel, then the sixth and lowest tier of Israeli football. In their first season of existence, the club won Liga Gimel Samaria division and were promoted to Liga Bet.

The club spent seven seasons in Liga Bet (the fourth tier since 2009–10), up until the 2012–13 season, when they finished bottom of the North B division and relegated to Liga Gimel.

In the 2014–15 season of Liga Gimel Jezreel division, the club started the season with eleven consecutive wins. The winning run came to an end at the twelfth match, when they lost at home 0–2 to Maccabi Isfiya. At the end of the season, the club won the division and made a return to Liga Bet.

== Honours ==
=== League ===
Honour	No.	Years
Fifth tier	1	2014–15
Sixth tier	1	2005–06

=== Cups ===
Honour	No.	Years
Liga Gimel divisional State Cup	2	2013–14, 2014–15
