= Israel Youth State Cup =

- Founded: 1949
- Region: Israel
- Current champions: Hapoel Petah Tikva
- Website: Avi Ran Youth Cup
- 2015–16

The Israel Youth State Cup (Hebrew: גביע לנוער על שם אבי רן, Avi Ran Youth Cup), is a knockout cup competition for under-19s in Israeli football, run by the Israel Football Association.

The cup is named after former Maccabi Haifa and Israel goalkeeper, Avi Ran.

== History ==
A cup competition for youth players was first organized in 1943–44. The competition was won by Maccabi Tel Aviv. After the establishment of Israel the competition was renewed in 1949 for a single tournament, and two tournaments were held in 1954 and 1955. Since 1958 the competition was played annually. The competition was called Kerner Cup until 1966 and later, until 1977, Jerusalem Cup.

== Format ==
The youth cup is a knockout, played by all the teams affiliated with the IFA. Lower tier teams enter the first stages and are joined in the fourth round by Israeli Noar Premier League teams.

== List of finals ==
Season	Winners	Score	Runners–up
1949	Maccabi Tel Aviv	3–0	Maccabi Ramat Gan
1954	Gadna Yehuda	4–1	Hapoel Tel Aviv
1955	Maccabi Haifa	2–1	Hapoel Hadera
1958	Maccabi Jaffa	3–2	Gadna Yehuda
1960	Hapoel Tel Aviv	1–0	Maccabi Netanya
1961	Maccabi Tel Aviv	3–0	Hapoel Tel Aviv
1962	Gadna Yehuda	2–1	Hapoel Tel Aviv
1963	Gadna Yehuda	1–1 (Note: The match was abandoned and a replay was ordered.); 1–0	Maccabi Netanya
1964	Hapoel Haifa	3–0	Maccabi Haifa
1965	Maccabi Tel Aviv	3–2	Gadna Yehuda
1966	Hapoel Kfar Saba	2–1	Hapoel Holon
1967	Gadna Yehuda	2–1	Hapoel Tel Aviv
1968	Hapoel Tel Aviv	2–0	Hapoel Hadera
1969	Sektzia Nes Tziona	3–0	Shimshon Tel Aviv
1970	Shimshon Tel Aviv	1–0	Hapoel Petah Tikva
1971	Maccabi Tel Aviv	7–0	Hapoel Ra'anana
1972	Bnei Yehuda	2–1	Maccabi Jaffa
1973	Maccabi Tel Aviv	0–0 (a.e.t.) (5–4 p.)	Beitar Jerusalem
1974	Beitar Tel Aviv	2–1	Hapoel Be'er Sheva
1975	Beitar Tel Aviv	2–1	Beitar Netanya
1976	Maccabi Petah Tikva	1–0	Hapoel Petah Tikva
1977	Maccabi Netanya	2–1	Hapoel Tel Aviv
1978	Hapoel Ramat Gan	1–0	Gadna Yehuda
1979	Hapoel Rishon LeZion	1–0	Hapoel Hadera
1980	Maccabi Haifa	2–1	Gadna Yehuda
1981	Maccabi Tel Aviv	1–1 (a.e.t.) (5–4 p.)	Maccabi Haifa
1982	Hapoel Hadera	2–0	Hapoel Tel Aviv
1983	Hapoel Hadera	1–0	Hapoel Haifa
1984	Hapoel Ramat Gan	1–0	Maccabi Tel Aviv
1985	Hapoel Be'er Sheva	1–1 (a.e.t.) (5–4 p.)	Maccabi Netanya
1986	Hapoel Tel Aviv	0–0 (a.e.t.) (4–3 p.)	Hapoel Be'er Sheva
1987	Hapoel Haifa	4–2	Maccabi Petah Tikva
1988	Maccabi Tel Aviv	8–0	Hapoel Kiryat Ata
1989	Shimshon Tel Aviv	1–0	Maccabi Haifa
1990	Hapoel Tel Aviv	2–0	Bnei Yehuda
1991	Maccabi Haifa	6–1	Maccabi Netanya
1992	Hapoel Tel Aviv	2–0	Hapoel Ra'anana
1993	Maccabi Haifa	2–2 (a.e.t.) (5–3 p.)	Hapoel Petah Tikva
1994	Hapoel Tzafririm Holon	1–0	Bnei Yehuda
1995	Maccabi Tel Aviv	2–1	Maccabi Netanya
1996	Maccabi Netanya	2–1	Hapoel Haifa
1997	Maccabi Tel Aviv	3–1	Maccabi Haifa
1998	Maccabi Tel Aviv	2–0	Bnei Yehuda
1999	Maccabi Haifa	3–0	Maccabi Tel Aviv
2000	Maccabi Haifa	3–1	Hapoel Haifa
2001	F.C. Ashdod	1–1 (a.e.t.) (4–2 p.)	Maccabi Tel Aviv
2002	Maccabi Tel Aviv	3–1	Beitar Nes Tubruk
2003	Maccabi Haifa	3–1	Maccabi Tel Aviv
2004	Maccabi Petah Tikva	1–0	Hapoel Kfar Saba
2005	Maccabi Herzliya	1–1 (a.e.t.) (5–4 p.)	Bnei Yehuda
2006	Beitar Jerusalem	1–1 (a.e.t.) (4–3 p.)	Hapoel Tel Aviv
2007	Beitar Jerusalem	3–0	F.C. Ashdod
2008	F.C. Ashdod	3–0	Maccabi Netanya
2009	Hapoel Tel Aviv	2–1	Maccabi Tel Aviv
2010	Hapoel Rishon LeZion	2–1	Beitar Jerusalem
2011	Maccabi Tel Aviv	3–1	Hapoel Be'er Sheva
2012	F.C. Ashdod	1–1 (a.e.t.) (4–3 p.)	Maccabi Haifa
2013	Maccabi Haifa	2–1	Maccabi Netanya
2014	Maccabi Haifa	4–0	Hapoel Haifa
2015	Hapoel Tel Aviv	0–0 (a.e.t.) (8–7 p.)	Ironi Kiryat Shmona
2016	Hapoel Petah Tikva	1–0 (a.e.t.)	Hapoel Tel Aviv
2017	Hapoel Ra'anana	1–0	Hapoel Rishon LeZion

== Results by team ==
Teams shown in italics are no longer in existence.

Club	Wins	Runners-up	Total final appearances
Maccabi Tel Aviv	13	5	18
Maccabi Haifa	9	5	14
Hapoel Tel Aviv	7	8	15
Gadna Yehuda	4	4	8
Maccabi Petah Tikva	3	3	6
F.C. Ashdod	3	1	4
Maccabi Netanya	2	7	9
Hapoel Haifa	2	4	6
Hapoel Hadera	2	3	5
Beitar Jerusalem	2	2	4
Shimson Tel Aviv	2	1	3
Hapoel Rishon LeZion	2	1	3
Beitar Tel Aviv	2	—	2
Hapoel Ramat Gan	2	—	2
Bnei Yehuda	1	4	5
Hapoel Be'er Sheva	1	3	4
Hapoel Petah Tikva	1	3	4
Hapoel Ra'anana	1	2	3
Maccabi Jaffa	1	1	2
Hapoel Kfar Saba	1	1	2
Sektzia Nes Tziona	1	—	1
Maccabi Herzliya	1	—	1
Hapoel Tzafririm Holon	1	—	1
Beitar Netanya / Beitar Nes Tubruk	—	2	2
Maccabi Ramat Gan	—	1	1
Hapoel Kiryat Ata	—	1	1
Hapoel Holon	—	1	1
Ironi Kiryat Shmona	—	1	1
