= Gadna Tel Aviv Yehuda F.C. =

Israeli football club

Gadna Tel Aviv Yehuda Youth
- Full name: מועדון הכדורגל גדנ"ע תל אביב יהודה
- Founded: 1947, as Gadna Yehuda
- Ground: Gadna Ground, Tel Aviv
- Chairman: Menachem Mor
- Coach: Moshe Pizanti
- League: Youth Liga Leumit South
- 2014–15: 3rd
Home colours	Away colours

Gadna Tel Aviv Yehuda Football Club (Hebrew: מועדון הכדורגל גדנ"ע תל אביב יהודה), is a football club in Tel Aviv, Israel. The club is one of the most successful youth academies in the history of Israel, competing in youth competitions at all age levels.

== History ==
Gadna Yehuda was created in 1947 as a feeder team in the hope of transferring young Israeli players to the top clubs in Israel.

In 2008, after more than 61 years as only working in the youth leagues, the club created a senior side. In the 2010–11 season the senior side of the club got promoted to Liga Bet after they won Liga Gimel Tel Aviv Division. In the 2012–13 season they finished 14th in Liga Bet South A Division, and got relegated after losing the relegation play-offs against Hapoel Kiryat Ono and Maccabi Bnei Jaljulia. the senior club did not enter Liga Gimel at the 2013–14 season.

Gadna Tel Aviv Yehuda Senior
- Founded: 2008
- Dissolved: 2013
- Ground: Gadna Ground, Tel Aviv
- Chairman: Menachem Mor
- League: Liga Bet South A
- 2012–13: 14th (Relegated)

== Honours ==
=== Youth ===
Honour	No.	Years
League Championship	4	1958–59, 1959–60, 1964–65, 1997–98
State Cup	4	1953–54, 1961–62, 1962–63, 1966–67

=== Senior ===
==== League ====
Honour	No.	Years
Fifth tier	1	2010–11

=== Cups ===
Honour	No.	Years
Liga Gimel divisional State Cup	1	2009–10
