= Maccabi Petah Tikva F.C. =

Association football club in Israel

Maccabi Petah Tikva
- Full name: Maccabi Avshalom Ironi Petah Tikva Football Club
- Short name: MPT
- Founded: 1912; 114 years ago
- Ground: HaMoshava Stadium, Petah Tikva, Israel
- Capacity: 11,500
- Owner: Avi Luzon
- Chairman: Avi Luzon
- Manager: Ziv Arie
- League: Israeli Premier League
- 2025–26: Liga Leumit, 1st of 16 (champions)
- Website: m-pt.co.il
Home colours	Away colours

Maccabi Petah Tikva F.C. (Hebrew: מכבי פתח תקווה; "Maccabi Avshalom Ironi Petah Tikva F.C., מועדון ספורט מכבי אבשלום עירוני פתח תקווה) is an Israeli professional football club based in the city of Petah Tikva. It is part of the Maccabi World Union for international Jewish sports clubs.

== History ==
A chart showing the progress of Maccabi Petah Tikva through the Israeli football league system, from 1931–32 to the present

=== 1912: First steps in blue and white ===
The club was founded in 1912 by a group of Jewish students from Petah Tikva, who were studying in the Ottoman city of Constantinople (many of them would later serve in the Ottoman army during World War I), making it the second oldest Jewish football club in Israel after Maccabi Tel Aviv, which was formed in 1906.

=== 1920s: Pre-independence ===
In 1921, after the death of founder member Avshalom Gissin during the 1921 Palestine riots, the club added his name to the club's name, and the club was named "Maccabi Avshalom Petah Tikva". In 1927, the club moved to the Maccabi Petah Tikva Ground, where they would play until the 1970s.

=== 1930s: First major title ===
In 1935 they won their first piece of silverware, beating Hakoah Tel Aviv 1–0 in the cup final. In 1939 they reached the final again, but lost 2–1 to Hapoel Tel Aviv. The following year they won the Haaretz tournament.

=== 1950s: Second major title and goals galore ===
The club was included in the new Israeli League in 1949, and finished fifth in the inaugural post-independence league table. In the next season (1951–52, there was no 1950–51 edition) they finished as runners-up to champions Maccabi Tel Aviv and also won the State Cup, beating Maccabi Tel Aviv 1–0. In 1953–54 (1952–53 was also not played) they also finished second with Eliezer Spiegel finishing as the league's top goalscorer on 16 goals from 22 matches.

=== 1960s: The dark times ===
After several seasons of mid-table finishes, Maccabi finished bottom of the table in 1962–63 (a season in which the club were deducted 3 points due to suspicions of bribery during a game with Maccabi Jaffa) and was due to be relegated to Liga Alef. However, the Israel Football Association decided to expand the league from 12 to 15 clubs and they were spared demotion. However, the club was relegated for the first time at the end of the 1965–66 season after finishing second from bottom.

After two seasons in Liga Alef (one of which;– 1966–68 Liga Leumit – lasted for two years) the club won the Liga Alef Super Cup and returned to the top division in 1968–69 as Liga Alef champions for the first time.

=== 1970s: We will be back! ===
At the end of the 1970–71 season the club was relegated again after finishing second from bottom but made an immediate return as Liga Alef champions (1971–72) for the second time.

At the beginning of 1972–73 season, the IFA organized a third-tier stand-alone cup competition (considered below the league and the state cup) to celebrate the 25th anniversary of the Israeli Declaration of Independence. The cup was won by Maccabi Petah Tikva, who had beaten Maccabi Haifa 4–2 on penalties (1–1 a.e.t.) in the final.

In 1974–75 season, although Maccabi finished bottom, they were again reprieved from relegation due to league expansion. However, after a repeated performance in 1976–77 they did relegated for the third time. Following another immediate return to the top flight through a second-place promotion (1977–78), the club maintained several mid-table finishes and have remained in top division for 10 seasons.

=== 1980s: Mediocrity at its finest ===
At the beginning of 1982–83 season the IFA established Lilian Cup, a season opening tournament for the top 4 clubs in Liga Leumit the year before, considered a third-tier League Cup tournament (in parallel to the Israel Super Cup, which was played at the end of the season, and the Toto Cup, which was played throughout the season, mostly on weekdays). Maccabi finished 1984–85 season in fourth place and gained a place in the 1985 Lilian Cup edition. The club reached the final, losing 3–1 (a.e.t.) to Beitar Jerusalem.

The club finished 1987–88 season at the bottom of the table and relegated for the fourth time. In 1989–90 and 1990–91 the club won the Toto Cup. After 3 seasons the club won the second-tier league championship for the third time (1990–91) and returned to the top division, remaining there for 21 seasons.

=== 1990s: First steps in Europe ===
In 1991–92 season Maccabi finished seventh place, qualifying for the Intertoto Cup group for the first time (due to Hapoel Petah Tikva qualification for the Cup Winners' Cup). The club played in the Group stage with Czech side Slavia Prague, German top club Bayer Leverkusen, and the Israeli Maccabi Netanya. The whole stage was scheduled for July 1992 with Maccabi playing its first two matches in Petah Tikva Municipal Stadium, losing 1–3 against Slavia and winning 3–2 against Leverkusen. The next two games were against Netanya, Maccabi drew 0–0 in Netanya Stadium and 2–2 at home ground. At the following matches, Maccabi was defeated 0–3 by Slavia in Stadion Eden and drew 1–1 against Leverkusen in Ulrich-Haberland-Stadion. However, the club finished only third place in the group with five points.

In 1994–95 season the club reached the top division's Toto Cup final for the first time, beating 2–1 Maccabi Tel Aviv in Ramat Gan Stadium.

In 1996–97 season Maccabi finished in fourth place, qualifying for the Intertoto Cup group stage for the second time. The whole stage was scheduled for June–July 1997, with Maccabi losing 1–3 to German side Köln in Ramat Gan and deafening the Austrian side Aarau 1–0 in Stadion Brügglifeld. The club also drew 0–0 twice, first against the Irish Cork City in Kiryat Eliezer Stadium and then against the Belgian giants Standard Liège in Stade Maurice Dufrasne. Eventually the club finished in second place in the group with five points and failed to advance to the semi-finals.

=== 2000s: European glory nights ===
In 2000–01 season the club made a 3–2 (a.e.t) sensational win over Maccabi Haifa and reached the cup final for the first time in 49 years (fourth time overall), losing 3–0 to Maccabi Tel Aviv.

The 2004–05 season marked the first time the club competed in UEFA Cup qualifiers after finishing third place of the league in the previous season. Maccabi began its way in the second qualifying round against Cyprus side AEK Larnaca, losing the first-leg 0–3 in GSP Stadium. Two weeks later, the club enjoyed a moment of European glory, winning the second leg 4–0 in Ramat Gan Stadium and advancing to the UEFA Cup first round after 4–3 on aggregate. However, the first-leg of the tie against Dutch side SC Heerenveen in Israel was canceled by UEFA due to a baggage handlers strike, and the club lost the second-leg 5–0 (also on aggregate) in Abe Lenstra Stadion.

Maccabi's most significant achievement of the decade came in the 2004–05 season when the club finished second in the league and reached the group stage of the 2005–06 UEFA Cup. In the second qualifying round the club defeated Macedonian side FK Baskimi 5–0 in Skopje stadium and 6–0 in Ramat Gan, advancing to the first round after 11–0 on aggregate.

Maccabi entered as an unseeded team due to a low coefficient rating (7.218), and drawn a seeded team such as Partizan Belgrade with a much higher coefficient rating (30.012). The Serbian side won the first-leg 2–0 in Ramat Gan. Two weeks later, at the second-leg in Partizan Stadium, Maccabi has made the impossible – contrary to all assessments and expectations, with a lot of faith and ability above all, they won 5–2 and 5–4 on aggregate. In a sensational comeback with striker Omer Golan scoring a hat-trick (21', 44', 48').

The victory sent Maccabi to be a member of Group B, along with Palermo, Brøndby, Lokomotiv Moscow and Espanyol. However, these elite clubs proved to be too much for Maccabi to handle, and the club lost all four group-stage matches, scoring just 1 goal while conceding 9.

=== 2020s: It's been 72 years... ===
After a defeat to Hapoel Beer Sheva in the 2020 cup final, the club reached the final again during the Israel State Cup campaign. Once more facing Hapoel Beer Sheva, the club managed to lift the trophy, securing their third cup win after a 72-year drought. At the end of the 2024/25 season, Maccabi finished the league in 13th place and was relegated to the Liga Leumit. At the end of 2025/26 season, the team won the Liga Leumit title, securing automatic promotion from the first place.

== Players ==
=== Current squad ===
As of 6 September 2026

No.	Pos.	Nation	Player
1	GK	ISR	Dor Hevron
7	MF	ENG	Kyle Spence
8	MF	ISR	Lee-Yam Dan
9	FW	GHA	Samuel Owusu
10	FW	ISR	Ariel Lugassy
11	FW	ISR	Yuval Kretzo
12	DF	ISR	Itay Baruch
14	MF	ISR	Omer Shirazi
15	MF	ISR	Adar Ratner
16	MF	ISR	Noam Shemesh
17	DF	ISR	Aviv Salem
18	DF	ISR	Eitan Tibi
20	MF	ISR	Ido Cohen

No.	Pos.	Nation	Player
21	MF	GUI	Ibrahima Soumah
22	DF	ISR	Bashar Abdach
26	DF	ISR	Guy Dezent
27	MF	ISR	Yoav Koren
30	DF	ISR	Or Dadia
32	DF	ISR	Mohammed Hindy
39	GK	ISR	Maor Erlich
44	DF	CYP	Pavlos Korrea
53	MF	ISR	Liran Hazan
77	FW	COL	José Cortés
97	FW	MNE	Marko Rakonjac
99	MF	ISR	Eyal Inbrum
—	DF	CIV	Yao Eloge

=== Out on loan ===
No.	Pos.	Nation	Player
—	DF	ISR	Hadar Fuchs (at Hapoel Kfar Saba until 30 June 2027)
—	DF	ISR	Shavit Elgaby (at Hapoel Rishon LeZion until 30 June 2027)

=== Retired numbers ===
- 4 (Russia) – Murad Magomedov, Center back, Played in club 1995–2013.

== Stadium ==
The club played at the Maccabi Petah Tikva ground between 1926 and the 1970s. Since they left the old Maccabi Petah Tikva ground they shared the 6,768-capacity Petah Tikva Municipal Stadium with city rivals Hapoel. At the end of 2011, the club moved to HaMoshava Stadium.

== Notable coaches ==
- (Israel) Eliezer Spiegel (1955–1957)
- (United Kingdom) Jack Fairbrother (1958–1959)
- (Romania) (Israel) Alexander Vogel (1959–1960)
- (Israel) Eliezer Spiegel (1960–1961)
- (Israel) Eli Fuchs (1961–1962)
- (Israel) Emmanuel Scheffer (1962–1963)
- (Israel) Dror Kashtan (1991–1992)
- (Israel) Yehoshua Feigenbaum (1994–1995)
- (Israel) Moshe Sinai (1 June 1997 – 1 February 1998)
- (Israel) Eyal Lahman (1998–1999)
- (Israel) Yossi Mizrahi (1 July 1999 – 30 June 2001)
- (Israel) Eli Ohana (1 Jan – 30 June 2001)
- (Israel) Guy Luzon (1 Jan 2002 – 30 June 2007)
- (Israel) Yossi Mizrahi (1 July – 5 November 2007)
- (Israel) Guy Luzon (16 Jan – 30 April 2008)
- (Israel) Guy Azouri (21 Aug – 23 December 2008)
- (Israel) Roni Levi (22 Dec 2008 – 21 November 2009)
- (Israel) Freddy David (22 Nov 2009 – 8 May 2011)
- (Israel) Marco Balbul (28 May – 17 October 2011)
- (Israel) Eyal Lahman (18 Oct 2011 – 21 January 2012)
- (Israel) Moshe Sinai (22 Jan 2012 – 24 November 2013)
- (Israel) Yitav Luzon (24 Nov 2013 – 14)
- (Israel) Kobi Refua (19 Dec 2013 – 14)
- (Israel) Ran Ben Shimon (11 June 2014 – 29 February 2016)
- (Israel) Dani Golan (2 Mar – 16 May 2016)
- (Israel) Kobi Refua (31 May 2016 – 17 September 2017)
- (Israel) Sharon Mimer (17 September 2017 – 2018)
- (Israel) Elisha Levy (23 May 2018 – 6 January 2019)
- (Israel) Guy Luzon (20 January 2019 – 28 December 2021)
- (Israel) Benyamin Lam (26 December 2022 – 2 January 2024)
- (Israel) Ran Kojok (4 January – 2 June 2024)
- (Israel) Dan Roman (3 June 2024 – )

== Honours ==
=== Domestic competitions ===
==== League ====
- Israeli Premier League
  - Runners-up (3): 1951–52, 1953–54, 2003–04
- Liga Leumit (level II)
  - Champions (6): 1968–69, 1971–72, 1990–91, 2012–13, 2019–20, 2022–23, 2025–26
  - Runners-up (1): 1977–78

==== Cups ====
- State Cup
  - Winners (3): 1935, 1951–52, 2023–24
  - Runners-up (3): 1939, 2000–01, 2019–20
- Toto Cup
  - Winners (4): 1994–95, 1999–2000, 2003–04, 2015–16
  - Runners-up (1): 2010–11
- Toto Cup Artzit (level II)
  - Winners (2): 1989–90, 1990–91
- Israeli Super Cup
  - Runners-up (1): 2024
- Israeli Super Cup Liga Alef (level II)
  - Winners (1): 1968–69
- League Cup
  - Winners (1): 1973 (25th Anniversary Cup)
  - Runners-up (1): 1985 (Lilian Cup)

=== European competitions ===
- UEFA Cup
  - Group stage: 2005–06
  - First Round: 2004–05
- UEFA Intertoto Cup
  - Runners-up: 2006
  - Group stage: 1992, 1997

=== Other ===
- Magen Shimshon
  - Runners-up: 1925
- Magen Ha'aretz
  - Winners: 1941

=== Youth Division ===
- Israeli Youth Premier League
  - Winners (2): 2018–19, 2023–24
  - Runners-up (2): 2020–21, 2021–22
- Israeli Youth State Cup
  - Winners (3): 1975–76, 2003–04, 2024–25
  - Runners-up (3): 1987–88, 2020–21, 2021–22
- UEFA Youth League
  - Second Round: 2019–20

== European record ==
=== Matches ===
Key

- P = preliminary round
- Q = qualification round
- R = round
- PO = Play-off round
- KOPO = Knockout round play-off

Season	Competition	Round	Club	Home	Away	Aggregate
1992–93	Intertoto Cup	Group stage	(Czech Republic) Slavia Prague	1–3	0–3	3rd
1992–93	Intertoto Cup	Group stage	(Germany) Bayer Leverkusen	3–2	1–1	3rd
1992–93	Intertoto Cup	Group stage	(Israel) Maccabi Netanya	2–2	0–0	3rd
1997–98	UEFA Intertoto Cup	Group stage	(Germany) Köln	1–3	—N/a	2nd
1997–98	UEFA Intertoto Cup	Group stage	(Austria) Aarau	—N/a	1–0	2nd
1997–98	UEFA Intertoto Cup	Group stage	(Republic of Ireland) Cork City	0–0	—N/a	2nd
1997–98	UEFA Intertoto Cup	Group stage	(Belgium) Standard Liège	—N/a	0–0	2nd
2004–05	UEFA Cup	Q2	(Cyprus) AEK Larnaca	4–0	0–3	4–3
2004–05	UEFA Cup	R1	(Netherlands) Heerenveen	Cancelled (Note: Due to a general strike in Israel, the first leg was cancelled by UEFA.)	0–5	0–5
2005–06	UEFA Cup	Q2	(North Macedonia) Baskimi	6–0	5–0	11–0
2005–06	UEFA Cup	R1	(Serbia and Montenegro) Partizan	0–2	5–2	5–4
2005–06	UEFA Cup	Group stage	(Italy) Palermo	1–2	—N/a	5th
2005–06	UEFA Cup	Group stage	(Denmark) Brøndby	—N/a	0–2	5th
2005–06	UEFA Cup	Group stage	(Russia) Lokomotiv Moscow	0–4	—N/a	5th
2005–06	UEFA Cup	Group stage	(Spain) Espanyol	—N/a	0–1	5th
2006–07	UEFA Intertoto Cup	R2	(Bosnia and Herzegovina) Zrinjski	1–1	3–1	4–2
2006–07	UEFA Intertoto Cup	R3	(Cyprus) Ethnikos	0–2	3–2	3–4
2024–25	UEFA Europa League	Q2	(Portugal) Braga	0–5	0–2	0–7
2024–25	UEFA Conference League	Q3	(Romania) CFR Cluj	0–1	0–1	0–2

=== By competitions ===
- Correct as of 16 August 2024

Competition	S	Pld	W	D	L	GF	GA	GD
UEFA Cup / UEFA Europa League	3	13	4	0	9	21	28	−7
UEFA Conference League	1	2	0	0	2	0	2	−2
UEFA Intertoto Cup	3	14	4	6	4	16	20	−4
Total	6	29	8	6	15	37	50	−13
