= Beitar Nes Tubruk F.C. =

Israeli football club

Beitar Nes Tubruk
- Full name: Beitar Nes Tubruk Netanya בית״ר נס טוברוק נתניה
- Founded: 1939; 87 years ago (as Beitar Netanya)
- Ground: Tubruk Stadium
- Capacity: 500
- Owner: Arik Izikovich
- Manager: Illan Messika
- League: Liga Gimel Sharon
- 2015–16: 13th
Home colours	Away colours

Beitar Nes Tubruk Netanya (Hebrew: בית״ר נס טוברוק נתניה), formerly Beitar Netanya, is a football club in Netanya, Israel.

== History ==
=== Beitar Netanya ===
The original Beitar Netanya team spent several years in the lower divisions, mainly in the second division there the club played from 1961 to 1977, 1981–82 and in 1986 the club was promoted to the top division (then Liga Leumit) as Liga Artzit champions. However, the club won only three games in its first and only season in the top flight, and were relegated with just 10 points, the lowest ever total during a 16-team season.

At the end of the 1991–92 Liga Artzit season the club was relegated to the third tier and then disbanded in 1993. A consortium of Israeli investors purchased the club rights.

=== Beitar Nes Tubruk ===
Arik Izikovich, with the help of National team manager Shlomo Scharf had re-founded the club as a feeder team in the hope of transferring young Israeli players to European clubs and improving the national team.

=== Sponsorship ===
The club relies heavily on transfer fees and loan arrangements. The annual budget is generally around 3 million shekels, with about a third of that budget coming from Ya'akov Shahar of Maccabi Haifa ($130,000 for the first option on two under-21 players) and Meir Shamir ($100,000).

== Honours ==
=== League ===
Honour	No.	Years
Second tier	2	1939^{1}, 1985–86^{1}
Third tier	3	1960–61^{1}, 1980–81^{1}, 1984–85^{1}
Fifth tier	1	1996–97

=== Cups ===
Honour	No.	Years
Liga Gimel divisional State Cup	1	2014–15

^{1}As Beitar Netanya

== Notable former players ==
- Gad Machnes (born 1956)
- Vicky Peretz (1953–2021)

== Notable former managers ==
=== From Beitar Netanya ===
- Yehoshua Feigenbaum
- Shmulik Perlman

=== From Beitar Nes Tubruk (Youth) ===
- Beni Lam
- Gad Machnes (born 1956)
