= 2023–24 Israeli Premier League =

Israeli Premier League
- Season: 2023–24
- Dates: 26 August 2023 – 25 May 2024
- Champions: Maccabi Tel Aviv
- Relegated: Hapoel Petah Tikva; Hapoel Tel Aviv
- UEFA Champions League: Maccabi Tel Aviv
- UEFA Europa League (via State Cup): Maccabi Petah Tikva
- UEFA Conference League: Maccabi Haifa; Hapoel Be'er Sheva
- Matches: 227
- Goals: 571 (2.52 per match)
- Top goalscorer: Dean David / Eran Zahavi (20 goals)
- Biggest home win: Maccabi Haifa 5–0 Maccabi Petah Tikva (14 January 2024)
- Biggest away win: Hapoel Tel Aviv 0–5 Maccabi Tel Aviv (26 September 2023); F.C. Ashdod 0–5 Maccabi Haifa (25 February 2024)
- Highest scoring: Beitar Jerusalem 4–4 Hapoel Be'er Sheva (23 December 2023)
- Longest winning run: 10 ‍–‍ Maccabi Tel Aviv (Note: Matches 3–12)
- Longest unbeaten run: 16 ‍–‍ Maccabi Haifa (Note: Matches 3–18)
- Longest winless run: 10 — Hapoel Tel Aviv (Note: Matches 21–31)
- Longest losing run: 5 — 4 Teams
- Highest attendance: 29,842; Maccabi Haifa 0-1 Maccabi Tel Aviv (11 May 2024)
- All statistics correct as of 17 May 2024.

The 2023–24 Israeli Premier League, also known as Ligat ONE ZERO for sponsorship reasons, was the 25th season since the introduction of the Israeli Premier League in 1999 and the 82nd season of top-tier football in Israel.

== Teams ==
The league consisted of fourteen teams; twelve sides from the previous season and two promoted teams from the 2022–23 Liga Leumit (Maccabi Petah Tikva and Hapoel Petah Tikva). Maccabi Petah Tikva returned to the top flight after a single season, while Hapoel Petah Tikva returned after 9 seasons (for the first time since the 2014–15 season). They replaced the 2022–23 Israeli Premier League bottom two teams, Ironi Kiryat Shmona and Sektzia Ness Ziona.

Locations of the 2023–24 Israeli Premier League teams

=== Stadiums and locations ===
Team	Location	Stadium	Capacity
Beitar Jerusalem	Jerusalem	Teddy Stadium	31,733
Bnei Sakhnin	Sakhnin	Doha Stadium	8,500
F.C. Ashdod	Ashdod	Yud-Alef Stadium	7,800
Hapoel Be'er Sheva	Be'er Sheva	Turner Stadium	16,126
Hapoel Hadera	Hadera	Netanya Stadium (Note: The team play their home games at a neutral venue because their own ground does not meet league requirements.)	13,610
Hapoel Haifa	Haifa	Sammy Ofer Stadium	30,950
Hapoel Jerusalem	Jerusalem	Teddy Stadium	31,733
Hapoel Petah Tikva	Petah Tikva	HaMoshava Stadium	11,500
Hapoel Tel Aviv	Tel Aviv	Bloomfield Stadium	29,400
Maccabi Bnei Reineh	Reineh	Green Stadium	5,200
Maccabi Haifa	Haifa	Sammy Ofer Stadium	30,950
Maccabi Netanya	Netanya	Netanya Stadium	13,610
Maccabi Petah Tikva	Petah Tikva	HaMoshava Stadium	11,500
Maccabi Tel Aviv	Tel Aviv	Bloomfield Stadium	29,400

Beitar Jerusalem Hapoel Jerusalem	Hapoel Tel Aviv Maccabi Tel Aviv	Maccabi Bnei Reineh
Teddy Stadium	Bloomfield Stadium	Green Stadium
Maccabi Netanya Hapoel Hadera	Hapoel Haifa Maccabi Haifa	Maccabi Petah Tikva Hapoel Petah Tikva
Netanya Stadium	Sammy Ofer Stadium	HaMoshava Stadium
F.C. Ashdod	Bnei Sakhnin	Hapoel Be'er Sheva
Yud-Alef Stadium	Doha Stadium	Turner Stadium

=== Personnel and sponsorship ===
Team	President	Manager	Captain	Kitmaker	Shirt sponsor
Beitar Jerusalem	(Israel) Barak Abramov	(Israel) Barak Yitzhaki	(Israel) Ofir Kriaf	Umbro	Geshem Holdings
Bnei Sakhnin	(Israel) Mohammed Abu Younes	(Israel) Slobodan Drapić	(Israel) Maroun Gantous	Le Coq Sportif	White - Sakhnin Dairy
F.C. Ashdod	(Israel) Rafi Niddam	(Israel) Eli Levy	(Israel) Tom Ben Zaken	Nike	Radio Jerusalem
Hapoel Be'er Sheva	(Israel) Alona Barkat	(Israel) Elyaniv Barda	(Israel) Miguel Vítor	Umbro	Victory
Hapoel Hadera	(Israel) Yakir Schwartz	(Israel) Haim Silvas	(Israel) Menashe Zalka	Umbro	BTB
Hapoel Haifa	(Israel) Yoav Katz	(Israel) Ronny Levy	(Israel) Dor Malul	Diadora	Leos
Hapoel Jerusalem	(Israel) Yotam Karmon	(Israel) Ziv Arie	(Israel) Ofek Bitton	Legea	Alon Ventures
Hapoel Tel Aviv	(United States) David Mincberg	(Israel) Salim Tuama (caretaker)	(Israel) Dan Einbinder	Adidas	Hcsra Insurance
Hapoel Petah Tikva	(Israel) Almog Portman	(Israel) Benyamin Lam	(Israel) Ram Levy	Lotto	Mivne Group
Maccabi Bnei Reineh	(Israel) Saeed Basoul	(Israel) Sharon Mimer	(Israel) Eyad Hutba	Zeus Sport	Boneh Renih
Maccabi Haifa	(Israel) Ya'akov Shahar	(Israel) Messay Dego	(Israel) Lior Refaelov	Adidas	Volvo
Maccabi Netanya	(Israel) Eyal Segal	(Israel) Marco Balbul	(Israel) Aviv Avraham	Lotto	
Maccabi Petah Tikva	(Israel) Avraham Luzon	(Israel) Ran Kojok	(Israel) Mohammed Hindy	Kelme	Jucky
Maccabi Tel Aviv	(Cyprus) Jack Angelides	(Republic of Ireland) Robbie Keane	(Israel) Sheran Yeini	Fila	Israel Canada

==== Managerial changes ====
Team	Outgoing manager	Manner of departure	Date of vacancy	Position in table	Incoming manager	Date of appointment
Bnei Sakhnin	(Israel) Kobi Refua	End of contract	20 May 2023	Pre-season	(Israel) Slobodan Drapić	20 May 2023
Ashdod	(Israel) Ran Ben Shimon	Mutual consent	20 May 2023	Pre-season	(Israel) Eli Levy	20 May 2023
Maccabi Haifa	(Israel) Barak Bakhar	Signed by Red Star Belgrade	20 May 2023	Pre-season	(Israel) Messay Dego	20 May 2023
Hapoel Tel Aviv	(Israel) Haim Silvas	Mutual consent	20 May 2023	Pre-season	(Greece) Michael Valkanis	3 June 2023
Maccabi Tel Aviv	(Spain) Aitor Karanka	Sacked	25 June 2023	Pre-season	(Republic of Ireland) Robbie Keane	26 June 2023
Hapoel Tel Aviv	(Australia) Michael Valkanis	Signed by Ajax	30 October 2023	7th	(Spain) Borja Lema	30 October 2023
Maccabi Netanya	(Israel) Ran Kojok	Sacked	23 December 2023	11th	(Israel) Guy Tzarfati	24 December 2023
Maccabi Petah Tikva	(Israel) Benyamin Lam	Sacked	2 January 2024	10th	(Israel) Ran Kojok	5 January 2024
Hapoel Hadera	(Israel) Nissim Avitan	Sacked	16 January 2024	13th	(Israel) Haim Silvas	17 January 2024
Hapoel Tel Aviv	(Spain) Borja Lema	Sacked	27 January 2024	7th	(Israel) Salim Tuama (caretaker)	27 January 2024
Beitar Jerusalem	(Israel) Yossi Abukasis	Resigned	31 January 2024	8th	(Israel) Gal Cohen (caretaker)	1 February 2024
Hapoel Tel Aviv	(Israel) Salim Tuama (caretaker)	End of caretaking spell	6 February 2024	8th	(Israel) Yossi Abukasis	6 February 2024
Hapoel Petah Tikva	(Israel) Ofer Tesselpepe	Sacked	11 February 2024	14th	(Israel) Benyamin Lam	12 February 2024
Beitar Jerusalem	(Israel) Gal Cohen (caretaker)	End of caretaking spell	18 February 2024	11th	(Israel) Barak Yitzhaki	19 February 2024
Maccabi Netanya	(Israel) Guy Tzarfati	Sacked	1 April 2024	11th	(Israel) Marco Balbul	1 April 2024
Hapoel Tel Aviv	(Israel) Yossi Abukasis	Sacked	28 April 2024	13th	(Israel) Salim Tuama (caretaker)	28 April 2024

==== Foreign players ====
The number of foreign players were restricted to six per team, while only five could have been registered to a game.
In bold: Players that have been capped for their national team.

Club	Player 1	Player 2	Player 3	Player 4	Player 5	Player 6	Non-visa player
Beitar Jerusalem	(Portugal) Miguel Silva	(Bulgaria) **Plamen Galabov**	(Ivory Coast) Ismaila Soro	(Georgia (country)) **Nika Khorkheli**	(Costa Rica) Mayron George	(Nigeria) Fred Friday	(Russia) Grigori Morozov
Bnei Sakhnin	(Cyprus) **Konstantinos Sotiriou**	(Belgium) Stéphane Oméonga	(Romania) **Adrian Păun**	(Argentina) Claudio Spinelli			(Palestine) **Alaa Aldeen Hassan** (Palestine) **Abed Yassin**
F.C. Ashdod	(Uganda) **Timothy Awany**	(Scotland) Clark Robertson	(Ghana) Montari Kamaheni	(Cameroon) Martin Ndzie	(Ghana) Ebenezer Mamatah	(Democratic Republic of the Congo) **Jordan Botaka**	(France) Jordan Sebban
Hapoel Be'er Sheva	(Portugal) Hélder Lopes	(Gabon) **André Biyogo Poko**	(Romania) **Antonio Sefer**	(Netherlands) Imran Oulad Omar	(Colombia) Déinner Quiñones	(Kazakhstan) Artur Shushenachev	(Argentina) Mariano Bareiro (Bulgaria) **Yoni Stoyanov** (Argentina) Máximo Levi
Hapoel Hadera	(Senegal) Mamadou Mbodj	(Nigeria) Philip Ipole	(Croatia) Josip Tomašević	(Belgium) Samy Bourard	(Ghana) Godsway Donyoh	(Nigeria) James Adeniyi	(Serbia) Nikola Đurković
Hapoel Haifa	(Republic of the Congo) **Fernand Mayembo**	(Belarus) **Denis Polyakov**	(Liberia) **Mohammed Kamara**	(Brazil) Felipe Santos	(Belarus) **Dmitry Antilevsky**	(The Gambia) Jalo Korka	(Lebanon) George Diba
Hapoel Petah Tikva	(Austria) Nico Antonitsch	(Ecuador) Jean Quiñónez	(Haiti) **Djimy Alexis**	(England) Dennis Adeniran	(Ghana) Gilbert Koomson	(Nigeria) Fortune Bassey	(Guatemala) **Matan Peleg**
Hapoel Jerusalem	(Nigeria) **Adebayo Adeleye**	(Ivory Coast) Yao Eloge Koffi	(Angola) **Capita**	(Ivory Coast) Cédric Franck Don	(Cameroon) Kévin Soni	(Netherlands) Jelle Duin	
Hapoel Tel Aviv	(Lithuania) **Emilijus Zubas**	(Republic of the Congo) **Bryan Passi**	(Slovenia) Alen Ožbolt	(The Gambia) Bubacarr Tambedou			(Republic of the Congo) **Mavis Tchibota** (Colombia) David Cuperman (United States) Matthew Frank
Maccabi Bnei Reineh	(Serbia) Nemanja Ljubisavljević	(Guinea-Bissau) **Sambinha**	(Nigeria) Muhammed Usman Edu	(Venezuela) **Freddy Vargas**	(Panama) Freddy Góndolaa	(Hungary) Márk Koszta	(Palestine) **Abdallah Jaber** (Palestine) Omar Nahfaoui
Maccabi Haifa	(France) Pierre Cornud	(Haiti) **Frantzdy Pierrot**	(Senegal) **Abdoulaye Seck**	(Angola) **Show**	(Croatia) Lorenco Šimić		(Niger) **Ali Mohamed** (Germany) Erik Shuranov (Sweden) **Daniel Sundgren** (United States) Kenny Saief (Russia) Daniil Lesovoy
Maccabi Netanya	(Georgia (country)) Saba Khvadagiani	(France) Nassim Ouammou	(Cameroon) Boris Enow	(Serbia) Igor Zlatanović	(Ghana) Ibrahim Tanko	(Ukraine) Stanislav Bilenkyi	
Maccabi Petah Tikva	(Cyprus) Andreas Karo	(Benin) **Moïse Adiléhou**	(Nigeria) Ibraheem Jabaar	(Slovenia) Luka Štor	(Mali) **Saliou Guindo**	(Argentina) Marco Wolff	
Maccabi Tel Aviv	(Spain) Enric Saborit	(Netherlands) Derrick Luckassen	(Angola) **Felício Milson**	(Portugal) Kiko Bondoso	(Panama) **Orlando Mosquera**	(Ghana) Henry Addo	(Netherlands) Joris van Overeem (Brazil) Daniel Tenenbaum

== Regular season ==
=== Regular season table ===
Pos	Team	Pld	W	D	L	GF	GA	GD	Pts	Qualification
1	Maccabi Tel Aviv	26	19	5	2	55	20	+35	62 (Note: Maccabi Tel Aviv had 1 point deducted. but after appeal the 1 point was returned)	Qualification for the Championship round
2	Maccabi Haifa	26	17	6	3	55	18	+37	55 (Note: Maccabi Haifa had 2 points deducted.)	Qualification for the Championship round
3	Hapoel Be'er Sheva	26	15	4	7	45	19	+26	49	Qualification for the Championship round
4	Hapoel Haifa	26	14	5	7	38	32	+6	47	Qualification for the Championship round
5	Maccabi Bnei Reineh	26	8	10	8	27	26	+1	34	Qualification for the Championship round
6	Bnei Sakhnin	26	7	13	6	26	31	−5	33 (Note: Bnei Sakhnin had 1 point deducted.)	Qualification for the Championship round
7	Hapoel Jerusalem	26	8	7	11	28	33	−5	31	Qualification for the Relegation round
8	Maccabi Petah Tikva	26	8	6	12	31	48	−17	30	Qualification for the Relegation round
9	Maccabi Netanya	26	8	4	14	29	41	−12	28	Qualification for the Relegation round
10	Hapoel Hadera	26	8	4	14	21	38	−17	28	Qualification for the Relegation round
11	Hapoel Tel Aviv	26	6	9	11	29	37	−8	26 (Note: Hapoel Tel Aviv had 1 point deducted.)	Qualification for the Relegation round
12	Beitar Jerusalem	26	8	6	12	34	34	0	25 (Note: Beitar Jerusalem had 5 points deducted.)	Qualification for the Relegation round
13	F.C. Ashdod	26	5	7	14	20	42	−22	22	Qualification for the Relegation round
14	Hapoel Petah Tikva	26	3	10	13	20	39	−19	19	Qualification for the Relegation round

Source: Soccerway
Rules for classification: 1) Points; 2) Goal difference; 3) Matches won; 4) Goals scored; 5) Head-to-head points; 6) Head-to-head goal difference; 7) Head-to-head goals scored; 8) Play-off.

=== Regular season results ===
Home \ Away	MTA	MHA	HHA	HBS	MBR	BnS	MPT	HJE	MNE	HTA	HAH	BEI	ASH	HPT
Maccabi Tel Aviv	—	0–1	3–1	1–0	1–1	1–1	4–0	2–1	2–1	4–2	1–1	1–0	4–1	2–0
Maccabi Haifa	2–0	—	1–1	1–0	1–0	1–1	5–0	2–1	4–0	0–0	1–0	1–1	4–0	2–1
Hapoel Haifa	0–1	0–3	—	1–0	1–2	1–2	2–2	2–3	2–1	4–3	2–0	3–2	2–0	1–1
Hapoel Be'er Sheva	0–1	2–1	4–0	—	4–2	1–2	1–1	3–0	2–0	0–0	3–0	1–0	1–0	3–0
Maccabi Bnei Reineh	2–2	2–1	0–0	1–1	—	0–1	3–0	1–1	1–3	1–2	2–1	2–1	0–0	1–1
Bnei Sakhnin	2–3	0–3	1–1	0–2	0–0	—	1–1	2–1	1–1	1–1	0–1	2–1	1–1	0–0
Maccabi Petah Tikva	1–2	3–2	0–3	1–4	1–0	5–1	—	1–1	1–0	3–0	1–0	0–3	1–2	2–0
Hapoel Jerusalem	1–2	1–2	0–1	0–1	1–0	0–0	3–1	—	1–1	2–1	1–0	2–1	1–1	3–2
Maccabi Netanya	1–5	2–3	1–2	1–0	1–1	0–1	0–1	2–1	—	2–1	1–3	0–3	1–0	4–1
Hapoel Tel Aviv	0–5	0–0	0–1	0–4	0–0	3–3	2–0	0–0	2–0	—	1–1	0–1	3–1	4–1
Hapoel Hadera	0–3	1–5	1–2	0–2	0–2	1–0	3–0	1–1	1–4	1–0	—	0–3	1–1	1–0
Beitar Jerusalem	0–1	0–2	1–2	4–4	1–2	1–1	3–2	1–0	0–0	0–3	2–0	—	1–1	2–2
F.C. Ashdod	1–4	0–5	0–1	1–3	1–0	0–1	1–1	2–0	0–2	2–1	0–1	1–2	—	2–0
Hapoel Petah Tikva	0–0	2–2	0–2	1–0	0–1	1–1	2–2	1–2	2–0	0–0	0–2	1–0	1–1	—

Source: "Ligat Ha'Al – Matches".
Legend: Blue = home team win; Yellow = draw; Red = away team win.

== Championship round ==
Key numbers for pairing determination (number marks position after 26 games)

Rounds
27th	28th	29th	30th	31st	32nd	33rd	34th	35th	36th
1 – 6; 2 – 5; 3 – 4	1 – 2; 5 – 3; 6 – 4	2 – 6; 3 – 1; 4 – 5	1 – 4; 2 – 3; 6 – 5	3 – 6; 4 – 2; 5 – 1	6 – 1; 5 – 2; 4 – 3	2 – 1; 3 – 5; 4 – 6	6 – 2; 1 – 3; 5 – 4	3 – 2; 4 – 1; 5 – 6	6 – 3; 2 – 4; 1 – 5

=== Championship round table ===
Pos	Team	Pld	W	D	L	GF	GA	GD	Pts	Qualification	MTA	MHA	HBS	HHA	MBR	BnS
1	Maccabi Tel Aviv (C)	36	26	7	3	75	25	+50	85	Qualification for the Champions League second qualifying round	—	1–1	3–0	4–0	2–0	2–0
2	Maccabi Haifa	36	23	7	6	75	28	+47	74 (Note: Maccabi Haifa had 2 points deducted.)	Qualification for the Conference League second qualifying round	0–1	—	4–1	0–2	1–2	1–0
3	Hapoel Be'er Sheva	36	19	4	13	55	40	+15	61	Qualification for the Conference League second qualifying round	1–0	1–4	—	2–1	2–1	2–1
4	Hapoel Haifa	36	18	5	13	48	47	+1	59		0–3	0–2	2–0	—	2–0	1–2
5	Maccabi Bnei Reineh	36	11	11	14	38	44	−6	44		2–3	1–5	1–0	0–1	—	2–2
6	Bnei Sakhnin	36	10	15	11	39	46	−7	44 (Note: Bnei Sakhnin had 1 point deducted.)		1–1	1–2	4–1	2–1	0–2	—

Source: Soccerway
Legend: Blue = home team win; Yellow = draw; Red = away team win.
Rules for classification: 1) Points; 2) Goal difference; 3) Matches won; 4) Goals scored; 5) Head-to-head points; 6) Head-to-head goal difference; 7) Head-to-head goals scored; 8) Play-off.
(C) Champions

== Relegation round ==
=== Relegation round table ===
Pos	Team	Pld	W	D	L	GF	GA	GD	Pts		HJE	MPT	MNE	ASH	BEI	HAH	HTA	HPT
7	Hapoel Jerusalem	33	12	7	14	38	39	−1	43			2–0			3–0	2–1	2–0	
8	Maccabi Petah Tikva	33	11	7	15	44	57	−13	40	Qualification for the Europa League second qualifying round (Note: Maccabi Petah Tikva qualified for the Europa League second qualifying round by winning the 2023–24 Israel State Cup.)			0–2	0–1			4–2	4–1
9	Maccabi Netanya	33	11	5	17	36	48	−12	38		1–0				0–3	1–2	0–1	
10	F.C. Ashdod	33	9	10	14	29	45	−16	37		3–1		0–0					1–0
11	Beitar Jerusalem	33	11	8	14	45	40	+5	36 (Note: Beitar Jerusalem had 5 points deducted.)			1–1		0–0		0–1		
12	Hapoel Hadera	33	10	6	17	28	49	−21	36			0–4		2–2			0–1	1–1
13	Hapoel Tel Aviv (R)	33	8	10	15	35	51	−16	33 (Note: Hapoel Tel Aviv had 1 point deducted.)	Relegation to Liga Leumit				0–2	1–5			1–1
14	Hapoel Petah Tikva (R)	33	4	12	17	25	51	−26	24	Relegation to Liga Leumit	1–0		1–3		0–2			

Source: Soccerway
Legend: Blue = home team win; Yellow = draw; Red = away team win.
Rules for classification: 1) Points; 2) Goal difference; 3) Matches won; 4) Goals scored; 5) Head-to-head points; 6) Head-to-head goal difference; 7) Head-to-head goals scored; 8) Play-off.
(R) Relegated

== Season statistics ==
=== Top scorers ===
As of 25 May 2024

Rank	Player	Club	Goals
1	(Israel) Dean David	Maccabi Haifa	20
1	(Israel) Eran Zahavi	Maccabi Tel Aviv	20
3	(Haiti) Frantzdy Pierrot	Maccabi Haifa	18
4	(Israel) Guy Melamed	Hapoel Haifa	17
5	(Israel) Yarden Shua	Beitar Jerusalem	12
5	(Israel) Elad Madmon	Hapoel Hadera	12
7	(Israel) Tomer Yosefi	Hapoel Haifa	11

== Attendances ==
Maccabi Tel-Aviv drew the highest average home attendance in the 2023-24 edition of the Israeli top-flight football league.

#	Football club	Home games	Average attendance
1	Maccabi Tel Aviv FC	13	20,356
2	Maccabi Haifa FC	13	20,344
3	Beitar Jerusalem FC	13	12,698
4	Hapoel Tel Aviv FC	13	11,025
5	Hapoel Be'er Sheva FC	13	9,943
6	Maccabi Netanya FC	13	6,079
7	Hapoel Petah Tikva FC	13	5,016
8	Hapoel Haifa FC	13	4,704
9	Hapoel Jerusalem FC	13	3,755
10	Maccabi Petah Tikva FC	13	3,309
11	Hapoel Hadera F.C.	13	2,799
12	Maccabi Bnei Reineh F.C.	13	2,119
13	Bnei Sakhnin FC	13	2,105
14	FC Ashdod	13	2,031
