= 1966 Israel Super Cup =

Hapoel Tel Aviv	Hapoel Haifa
2	1
- Date: 10 September 1966
- Venue: Kiryat Haim Stadium, Haifa
- Referee: Moshe Ashkenazi
- Attendance: 9,000

The 1966 Israel Super Cup was the fourth Israel Super Cup, an annual Israeli football match played between the winners of the previous season's Top Division and Israel State Cup. As the match was not set by the Israel Football Association, it was considered an unofficial cup.

The match was played between Hapoel Tel Aviv, champions of the 1965–66 Liga Leumit and Hapoel Haifa, winners of the 1965–66 Israel State Cup. At the match, played at Kiryat Haim Stadium, Hapoel Tel Aviv won 2–1.

== Match details ==
10 September 1966

Hapoel Tel Aviv	2–1	Hapoel Haifa
Chazom 20', 69'		Atzmon 55'

Kiryat Haim Stadium, Haifa
Attendance: 9,000
Referee: Menachem Ashkenazi

Hapoel Tel Aviv	Hapoel Haifa

GK	(Israel) Danny Elkayam
DF	(Israel) Shimon Ben Yehonatan	(c)
DF	(Israel) Yehoshua Feigenbaum
MF	(Israel) David Primo
MF	(Israel) Amatzia Levkovich
MF	(Israel) Shabi Ben Baruch
RW	(Israel) Danny Borsok
FW	(Israel) Avraham Cohen
FW	(Israel) Haim Nurieli
FW	(Israel) Yehezkel Chazom
LW	(Israel) George Borba
Manager: (Israel) Yosef Merimovich

GK	(Israel) Elyahu Benes
DF	(Israel) Shaltiel
DF	(Israel) Itzhak Razon	Substituted off
MF	(Israel) Eli Damti
MF	(Israel) Dov Atzmoin	Substituted off
MF	(Israel) Gabi Piker
RW	(Israel) Victor Young
FW	(Israel) Itzhak Englander
FW	(Israel) Gideon Goldberg
FW	(Israel) Yehoshua Palgi
FW	(Israel) Roby Young
Substitutes:
DF	(Israel) Amos Lazovski		Substituted in
MF	(Israel) David Gabison		Substituted in
FW	(Israel) Ephraim Laufer		Substituted in
FW	(Israel) Abba Gindin		Substituted in
Manager:
(Socialist Federal Republic of Yugoslavia) Miodrag Jovanović
