= List of Panathinaikos F.C. managers =

The following is a list of managers of Panathinaikos F.C. and their major honours from the foundation of the club in 1908 to the present.

== Managers ==
- Only competitive matches are counted
- (n/a) = Information not available

| Nane | From | To | Nationality | Matches | Won | Drawn | Lost | Win% | Honours | Notes |
|---|---|---|---|---|---|---|---|---|---|---|
| John Cyril Campbell | 1908 | 1914 | England | (n/a) | (n/a) | (n/a) | (n/a) | (n/a) | 3 Greek Championships; 1 Greek Cup | |
| Giorgos Kalafatis | 1918 | 1924 | Greece | (n/a) | (n/a) | (n/a) | (n/a) | (n/a) | 3 Greek Championships; 1 Greek Cup | |
| Apostolos Nikolaidis | 1924 | 1928 | Greece | (n/a) | (n/a) | (n/a) | (n/a) | (n/a) | | |
| Miklos Forner | 1928 | 1929 | Hungary | (n/a) | (n/a) | (n/a) | (n/a) | (n/a) | | |
| József Künsztler | 1929 | 1939 | Hungary | (n/a) | (n/a) | (n/a) | (n/a) | (n/a) | 1 Greek Championship | |
| Antonis Migiakis | 1 July 1945 | 30 June 1948 | Greece | (n/a) | (n/a) | (n/a) | (n/a) | (n/a) | 1 Greek Cup | |
| Johann Strnad | 1948 | 1949 | Austria | (n/a) | (n/a) | (n/a) | (n/a) | (n/a) | 1 Greek Championship | |
| Antonis Migiakis | 1 July 1949 | 30 June 1950 | Greece | (n/a) | (n/a) | (n/a) | (n/a) | (n/a) | | |
| Harry Game | 1 July 1950 | 30 June 1953 | England | (n/a) | (n/a) | (n/a) | (n/a) | (n/a) | 1 Greek Championship | |
| Svetislav Glišović | 1953 | 1958 | Yugoslavia | (n/a) | (n/a) | (n/a) | (n/a) | (n/a) | 1 Greek Cup | |
| János Zsolnai | 1958 | 1959 | Hungary | (n/a) | (n/a) | (n/a) | (n/a) | (n/a) | | |
| Antonis Migiakis | 1 July 1959 | 30 June 1960 | Greece | 31 | 23 | 5 | 3 | 74.2% | 1 Greek Championship | |
| Harry Game | 1 August 1960 | 30 June 1963 | England | 91 | 65 | 18 | 8 | 71.4% | 2 Greek Championships | |
| Stjepan Bobek | 1 July 1963 | 30 June 1967 | Yugoslavia | 120 | 84 | 25 | 11 | 70% | 2 Greek Championships; 1 Greek Cup | |
| Béla Guttmann | 6 August 1967 | 11 October 1967 | Austria | 1 | 1 | 0 | 0 | 100% | | |
| Lakis Petropoulos | 12 October 1967 | 7 June 1970 | Greece | 77 | 56 | 14 | 7 | 72.7% | 2 Greek Championships; 1 Greek Cup | |
| Ferenc Puskás | 1 July 1970 | 4 September 1974 | Hungary | 136 | 89 | 29 | 18 | 65.4% | 1 Greek Championship | |
| Stjepan Bobek | 5 September 1974 | 30 June 1975 | Yugoslavia | 30 | 11 | 12 | 7 | 36.6% | | |
| Aymoré Moreira | 1 July 1975 | 30 June 1976 | Brazil | 35 | 17 | 12 | 6 | 48.6% | | |
| Kazimierz Górski | 4 December 1976 | 4 November 1978 | Poland | 66 | 40 | 15 | 11 | 60.6% | 1 Greek Championship; 1 Greek Cup | |
| Lakis Petropoulos | 20 November 1978 | 12 November 1979 | Greece | 31 | 11 | 10 | 10 | 35.5% | | |
| Bruno Pesaola | 1 July 1979 | 30 June 1980 | Italy | (n/a) | (n/a) | (n/a) | (n/a) | (n/a) | | |
| Ronnie Allen | 1980 | 1980 | England | (n/a) | (n/a) | (n/a) | (n/a) | (n/a) | | |
| Andreas Papaemmanouil | 1980 | 1980 | Greece | (n/a) | (n/a) | (n/a) | (n/a) | (n/a) | | |
| Helmut Senekowitsch | 30 September 1980 | 30 June 1981 | Austria | (n/a) | (n/a) | (n/a) | (n/a) | (n/a) | | |
| Lakis Petropoulos | 16 June 1981 | 5 July 1982 | Greece | 35 | 19 | 12 | 4 | 54.3% | 1 Greek Cup | |
| Ştefan Kovács | 6 July 1982 | 7 March 1983 | Romania | (n/a) | (n/a) | (n/a) | (n/a) | (n/a) | | |
| Konstantinos Tsakos | 1983 | 1983 | Greece | (n/a) | (n/a) | (n/a) | (n/a) | (n/a) | | |
| Jacek Gmoch | 1 July 1983 | 19 June 1985 | Poland | 88 | 56 | 22 | 10 | 63.6% | 1 Greek Championship; 1 Greek Cup | |
| Pietr Packert | 21 June 1985 | 5 June 1986 | Czech Republic | (n/a) | (n/a) | (n/a) | (n/a) | (n/a) | 1 Greek Championship; 1 Greek Cup | |
| Tomislav Ivić | 10 June 1986 | 2 November 1986 | Yugoslavia | (n/a) | (n/a) | (n/a) | (n/a) | (n/a) | | |
| Vasilios Daniil | 3 November 1986 | 11 January 1988 | Greece | (n/a) | (n/a) | (n/a) | (n/a) | (n/a) | | |
| Gunder Bengtsson | 25 January 1988 | 2 November 1989 | Sweden | (n/a) | (n/a) | (n/a) | (n/a) | (n/a) | 2 Greek Cups; 1 Greek Super Cup | |
| Hristo Bonev | 3 November 1989 | 11 September 1990 | Bulgaria | 27 | 18 | 7 | 2 | 66.7% | 1 Greek Championship | |
| Vasilios Daniil | 13 September 1990 | 8 June 1992 | Greece | 46 | 22 | 13 | 11 | 47.8% | 1 Greek Championship; 1 Greek Football Cup | |
| Ivica Osim | 30 June 1992 | 13 March 1994 | Bosnia and Herzegovina | 63 | 41 | 10 | 12 | 65.1% | 1 Greek Football Cup; 1 Greek Super Cup | |
| Juan Ramón Rocha | 14 March 1994 | 13 October 1996 | Argentina | 92 | 67 | 14 | 11 | 72.8% | 2 Alpha Ethniki; 2 Greek Cups; 1 Greek Super Cup | |
| Velimir Zajec | 23 October 1996 | 18 May 1997 | Croatia | 28 | 15 | 4 | 9 | 53.6% | | |
| Nikos Karoulias | 19 May 1997 | 25 May 1997 | Greece | 1 | 1 | 0 | 0 | 100% | | Interim manager |
| Vasilios Daniil | 6 June 1997 | 2 March 1999 | Greece | 61 | 45 | 2 | 14 | 73.8% | | |
| Juan Ramón Rocha | 3 March 1999 | 3 June 1999 | Argentina | 13 | 8 | 4 | 1 | 61.5% | | |
| Giannis Kyrastas | 10 June 1999 | 29 May 2000 | Greece | 40 | 31 | 5 | 4 | 77.5% | | |
| Angelos Anastasiadis | 1 July 2000 | 21 February 2001 | Greece | 29 | 14 | 8 | 7 | 48.3% | | |
| Stratos Apostolakis | 22 February 2001 | 27 May 2001 | Greece | 13 | 8 | 2 | 3 | 61.5% | | |
| Giannis Kyrastas | 14 June 2001 | 16 December 2001 | Greece | 25 | 12 | 7 | 6 | 48.0% | | |
| Sergio Markarián | 17 December 2001 | 10 May 2002 | Uruguay | 24 | 16 | 5 | 3 | 66.6% | | |
| Fernando Santos | 1 July 2002 | 16 October 2002 | Portugal | 9 | 6 | 0 | 3 | 66.6% | | |
| Sergio Markarián | 22 October 2002 | 7 May 2003 | Uruguay | 39 | 27 | 8 | 4 | 69.2% | | |
| Itzhak Shum | 1 July 2003 | 5 October 2004 | Israel | 43 | 29 | 7 | 7 | 67.4% | 1 Alpha Ethniki; 1 Greek Cup | |
| Zdeněk Ščasný | 5 October 2004 | 5 February 2005 | Czech Republic | 18 | 8 | 6 | 4 | 44.4% | | |
| Totis Filakouris | 8 February 2005 | 16 February 2005 | Greece | 2 | 2 | 0 | 0 | 100% | | Interim manager |
| Alberto Malesani | 16 February 2005 | 15 May 2006 | Italy | 51 | 31 | 9 | 11 | 60.8% | | |
| Hans Backe | 15 May 2006 | 15 September 2006 | Sweden | 4 | 2 | 1 | 1 | 50% | | |
| Jasminko Velić | 15 September 2006 | 6 October 2006 | Bosnia and Herzegovina | 3 | 2 | 1 | 0 | 66.7% | | Interim manager |
| Víctor Muñoz | 9 October 2006 | 17 May 2007 | Spain | 38 | 18 | 9 | 11 | 47.4% | | |
| Jose Peseiro | 1 June 2007 | 15 May 2008 | Portugal | 46 | 30 | 10 | 6 | 65.2% | | |
| Henk ten Cate | 13 June 2008 | 8 December 2009 | Netherlands | 74 | 44 | 17 | 13 | 59.5% | | |
| Nikos Nioplias | 8 December 2009 | 15 November 2010 | Greece | 42 | 26 | 8 | 8 | 61.9% | 1 Super League; 1 Greek Cup | |
| Jacek Gmoch | 14 November 2010 | 20 November 2010 | Poland | 1 | 1 | 0 | 0 | 100% | | Interim manager |
| Jesualdo Ferreira | 21 November 2010 | 14 November 2012 | Portugal | 90 | 48 | 18 | 24 | 53.3% | | |
| Juan Ramon Rocha | 14 November 2012 | 7 January 2013 | Argentina | 10 | 5 | 1 | 4 | 50% | | |
| Fabriciano González | 8 January 2013 | 31 March 2013 | Spain | 13 | 5 | 3 | 5 | 38.5% | | |
| Giannis Vonortas | 31 March 2013 | 14 May 2013 | Greece | 3 | 1 | 2 | 0 | 33.3% | | Interim manager |
| Yannis Anastasiou | 14 May 2013 | 2 November 2015 | Greece | 118 | 66 | 24 | 28 | 55.9% | 1 Greek Cup | |
| Steve Rutter | 2 November 2015 | 14 November 2015 | England | 1 | 1 | 0 | 0 | 100% | | Interim manager |
| Andrea Stramaccioni | 9 November 2015 | 1 December 2016 | Italy | 52 | 22 | 14 | 16 | 42.3% | | |
| Marinos Ouzounidis | 1 December 2016 | 31 May 2018 | Greece | 57 | 25 | 17 | 15 | 43.8% | | |
| Georgios Donis | 1 June 2018 | 21 July 2020 | Greece | 77 | 33 | 22 | 22 | 42.9% | | |
| Dani Poyatos | 21 June 2020 | 12 October 2020 | Spain | 3 | 0 | 1 | 2 | 0% | | |
| Sotiris Sylaidopoulos | 12 October 2020 | 19 October 2020 | Greece | 1 | 0 | 1 | 0 | 0% | | Interim manager |
| László Bölöni | 19 October 2020 | 10 May 2021 | Romania | 34 | 14 | 6 | 10 | 43.8% | | |
| Sotiris Sylaidopoulos | 10 May 2021 | 24 May 2021 | Greece | 2 | 0 | 1 | 1 | 0% | | Interim manager |
| Ivan Jovanović | 17 June 2021 | 26 December 2023 | Serbia | 112 | 63 | 22 | 27 | 56.3% | 1 Greek Cup | |
| Fatih Terim | 26 December 2023 | 17 May 2024 | Turkey | 27 | 13 | 7 | 7 | 48.2% | | |
| Christos Kontis | 17 May 2024 | 10 June 2024 | Greece | 2 | 1 | 0 | 1 | 50.0% | 1 Greek Cup | Interim manager |
| Diego Alonso | 10 June 2024 | 29 October 2024 | Uruguay | 17 | 7 | 5 | 5 | 41.2% | | |
| Rui Vitória | 31 October 2024 | 15 September 2025 | Portugal | 43 | 22 | 10 | 11 | 51.2% | | |
| Christos Kontis | 18 September 2025 | 24 October 2025 | Greece | 7 | 3 | 2 | 2 | 42.8% | | |
| Rafael Benítez | 24 October 2025 | 22 May 2026 | Spain | 40 | 19 | 11 | 10 | 47.5% | | |
| Jacob Neestrup | 26 May 2026 | Present | Denmark | 0 | 0 | 0 | 0 | 0% | | |

== Notes and references ==
Specific
