= Hapoel Tel Aviv F.C. =

Association football club in Israel

Hapoel Tel Aviv
- Full name: Hapoel Tel Aviv Football Club
- Nicknames: Hapoel; The Reds; Workers
- Short name: HTA
- Founded: 1923; 103 years ago
- Ground: Bloomfield Stadium, Tel Aviv, Israel
- Capacity: 29,400
- Owner: Edmond M. Safra
- Manager: Elyaniv Barda
- League: Israeli Premier League
- 2025–26: Israeli Premier League, 4th of 14
- Website: www.htafc.co.il/en/
Home colours	Away colours	Third colours

Hapoel Tel Aviv Football Club (Hebrew: מועדון כדורגל הפועל תל אביב) is an Israeli professional football club based in Tel Aviv that competes in the Israeli Premier League. The club's traditional home ground is Bloomfield Stadium. To date, the club has won 13 championships and 16 State Cups. In 1967, Hapoel Tel Aviv became the first club to win the Asian Champion Club Tournament.

Since 1995, the club has competed in European club competitions, and has the highest rank among all Israeli clubs, with some outstanding achievements, such as wins against Chelsea, Milan, Hamburg, Paris Saint-Germain, Benfica, Rangers, and Celtic. It is also one of only three Israeli teams to have qualified for the UEFA Champions League group stage, and one of the two that are ordinary members of the European Club Association.

The club name, "Hapoel", translates to "The Worker", and combined with its red hammer and sickle badge represents the club's ties to Marxism, socialism, Labor Zionism, and the working class. For seven decades, the club was owned by the Histadrut, Israel's national trade union centre.

== History ==
A chart showing the progress of Hapoel Tel Aviv through the Israeli football league system, from 1931–32 to the present

=== British Mandate ===
Hapoel Tel Aviv F.C. was originally established in 1923, but was disbanded soon after. The club was re-formed in 1925, and then for a third time in May 1926. In 1927 the club merged with Allenby F.C., giving the club its modern form. It is part of the Hapoel sports association which was affiliated with the Histadrut, and supporters of the club were often referred to as communists.

In 1928 the club reached the Palestine Cup final (the first one to be recognised by the Israel Football Association). Although they beat Maccabi Hasmonean Jerusalem 2–0, Hapoel fielded an ineligible player, resulting in the cup being shared.

The 1933–34 saw the club win the double, finishing as champions of the Palestine League, winning every match, the only Palestinian club to have achieved such a feat, and winners of the cup, beating local rivals Maccabi Tel Aviv 3–2 in the final. The 1934–35 season saw Hapoel led the league table, but the championship was abandoned and they were not declared champions. The 1937–38 season ended the same way, with Hapoel top of the league, but the season abandoned. Meanwhile, the club won the cup again in 1937, 1938, and 1939, and remain the only club to have won the trophy in three successive seasons (although the Royal Air Force won it four consecutive seasons (1924 to 1927), pre-1928 wins are unrecognised by the IFA).

In 1939–40, they won their second championship. The following season no national championships were held, but the club won the tournament for Hapoel-affiliated clubs. They won a third championship in the 1943–44 season, and in the following year won the northern region league, as well as what became known as the "War Cup", which was boycotted by Beitar-affiliated clubs. In the cup final Hapoel were leading Hapoel Petah Tikva 1–0, but the match was abandoned on 89 minutes when a Petah Tikva player refused to leave the pitch after being sent off for insulting the referee.

=== State of Israel ===
Pyrotechnics at the Tel Aviv derby, 2005–06

Following Israeli independence, Hapoel joined the new Israeli League. They won the title in 1956–57 and the State Cup in 1961, beating Hapoel Petah Tikva 2–1.

In the 1965–66 season Hapoel won the title, and qualified for the first Asian Club Championships. In the tournament Hapoel were given byes all the way to the final, where they beat Selangor 2–1 to become Asia's first club champions. The club also reached the State Cup final that year, but lost 2–1 to Maccabi Tel Aviv.

Hapoel won the title again in 1968–69, and again qualified for the Asian Club championships. Although they reached the final, they lost 2–1 to Iranian side Taj Tehran (in an era when Iran and Israel had diplomatic relations). They won the State Cup again in 1972, beating Hapoel Jerusalem 1–0 in the final, but did not win the title again until 1980–81, when they missed out on the double after losing the cup final 4–3 on penalties (after a 2–2 draw) to Bnei Yehuda. The following season they reached the cup final again, but lost 1–0 to Hapoel Yehud. A hat-trick of cup final defeats was avoided when they beat Maccabi Tel Aviv 3–2 in the 1982 final.

Another title was won in 1985–86, and another in 1987–88. However, the following season Hapoel finished bottom of the league (with a four-point deduction for breaking budget rules) and were relegated to the second tier for the first time in their history.

The club made an immediate return to the top division as Liga Artzit runners-up, though they only beat Maccabi Yavne to the second promotion slot on goal difference. In 1997–98 Hapoel finished second, and qualified for Europe for the second time. In the 1998–99 UEFA Cup Hapoel knocked out FinnPa, before losing on penalties to Strømsgodset. In the same season they won the State Cup, beating Beitar Jerusalem 3–1 on penalties after a 1–1 draw.

==== 21st century ====
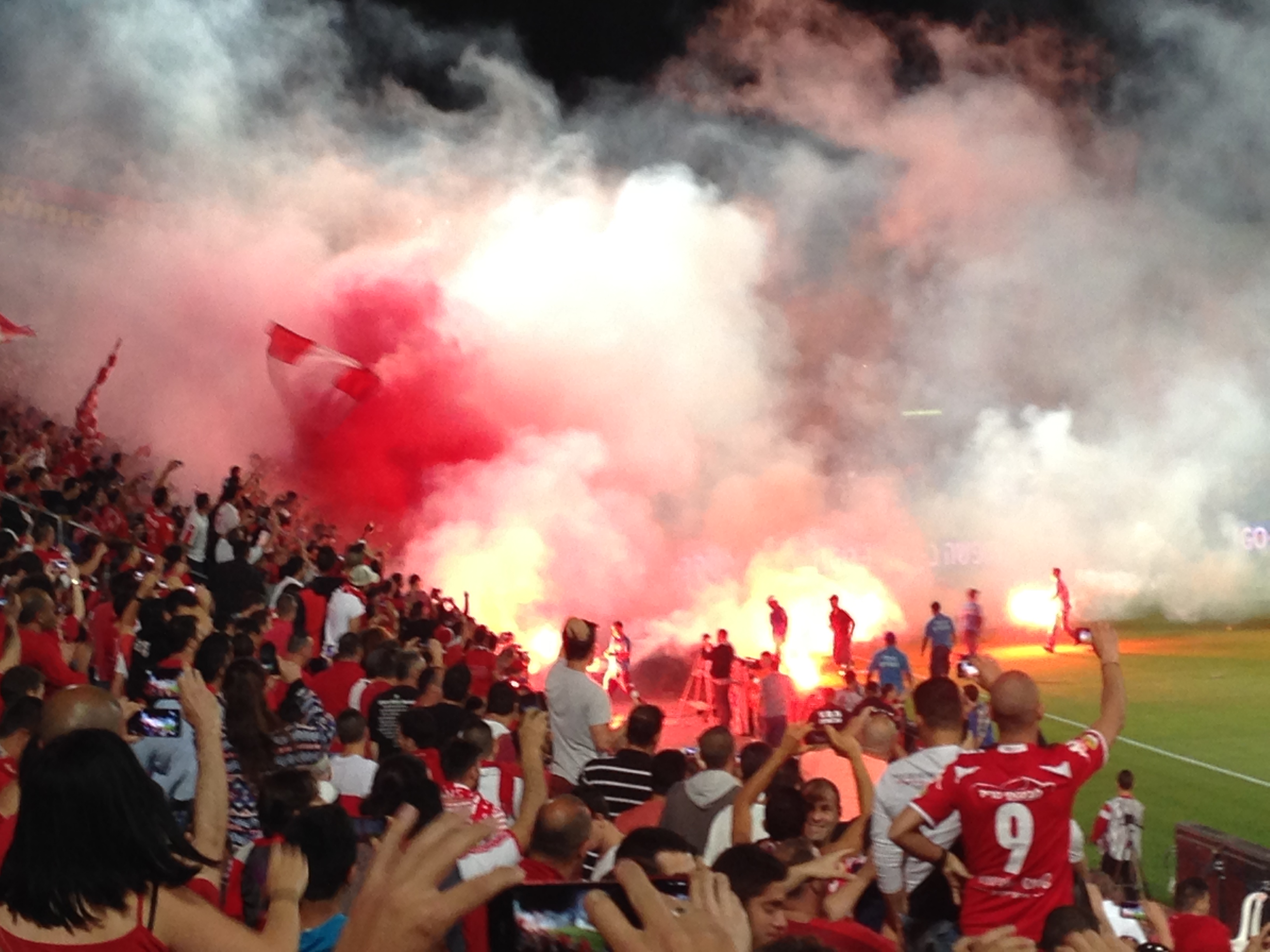
Hapoel Tel Aviv fans at Bloomfield Stadium before the Tel Aviv derby, 2014

The 1999–2000 season saw Hapoel win the double, claiming their first title in over a decade and winning the State Cup (beating Beitar Jerusalem on penalties again). However, they failed to reach the group stages of the Champions League after being beaten 5–1 on aggregate by Sturm Graz. They finished second in the league in 2000–01 and 2001–02 and third in 2002–03, qualifying for the UEFA Cup on each occasion. In the 2001–02 UEFA Cup Hapoel reached the quarter-finals after knocking out Chelsea, Lokomotiv Moscow and Parma. Although they beat A.C. Milan 1–0 in the home leg (a match which had to be played in the GSP Stadium in Cyprus as UEFA did not allow matches to be held in Israel due to security reasons), Hapoel lost the away leg 2–0.

In 2002 the club won its first Toto Cup. They won the State Cup in 2006, beating Bnei Yehuda 1–0 in the final, and also won it the following season, when they defeated second division Hapoel Ashkelon on penalties. They reached the final again in 2007–08, but lost 5–4 on penalties to Beitar Jerusalem after a 0–0 draw.

In 2009–10, the club won the double, claiming the State Cup after a 3–1 victory over Bnei Yehuda. The title was won after a dramatic game against Beitar Jerusalem on the final day of the season, with Eran Zahavi scoring the title-winning goal two minutes into injury time. The club also had a successful season in the Europa League, winning their group, before losing to Rubin Kazan in the second round. The following season they reached the group stages of the Champions League for the first time, but failed to advance to the next round. at the same season the team reached to the second place and won the Israeli State Cup for the second time in row.

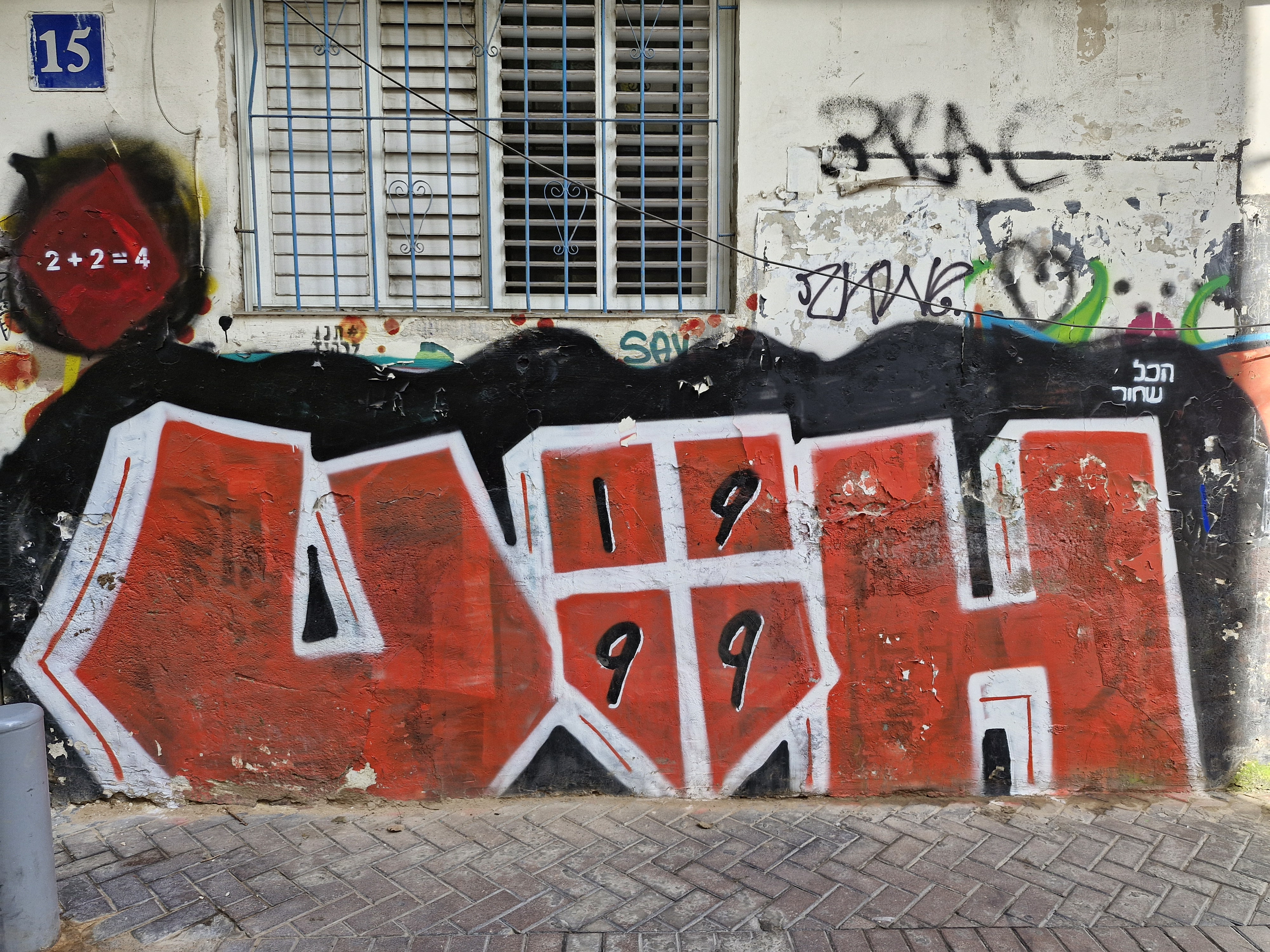
Ultras Hapoel street art in Tel Aviv.

In the beginning of season 2011–12 most of the successful players of the team left and spread at Europe, also the Team's manager Eli Guttman left too. The club's legendary coach, Dror Kashtan, returned and new players came as part of the transfer of ownership of the club to Eli Tabib. During the season there was tension between the manager Dror Kashtan and Eli Tabib, which led to the manager's departure and current Manager was appointed in his place, Nitzan Shirazi, who led the team winning the Israeli State Cup for the third time in a row. After large-scale protests of the fans against the club's owner Tabib and his unprofessional conduct, he decided to leave the club after one year and sold it to Haim Ramon and to the supporters' trust called "Haadumim", "The Reds" in Hebrew, that establish at the summer of 2012 and raise 2 million shekel for 20% of the ownership. The other part of the club sold to several other businessmen. Altogether the club sold at summer 2012 for 12 million NIS (about $ 3 Million). At the beginning of season 2012–13, Yossi Abuksis was appointed coach in place of Nitzan Shirazi, who appointed professional manager due to his health reasons. On 1 July 2015, the club was bought by Amir Gross Kabiri. Due to financial problems Kabiri and the club split. 2023 the Mintzberg group is announced as new owner.

== Stadium ==
=== Bloomfield Stadium ===
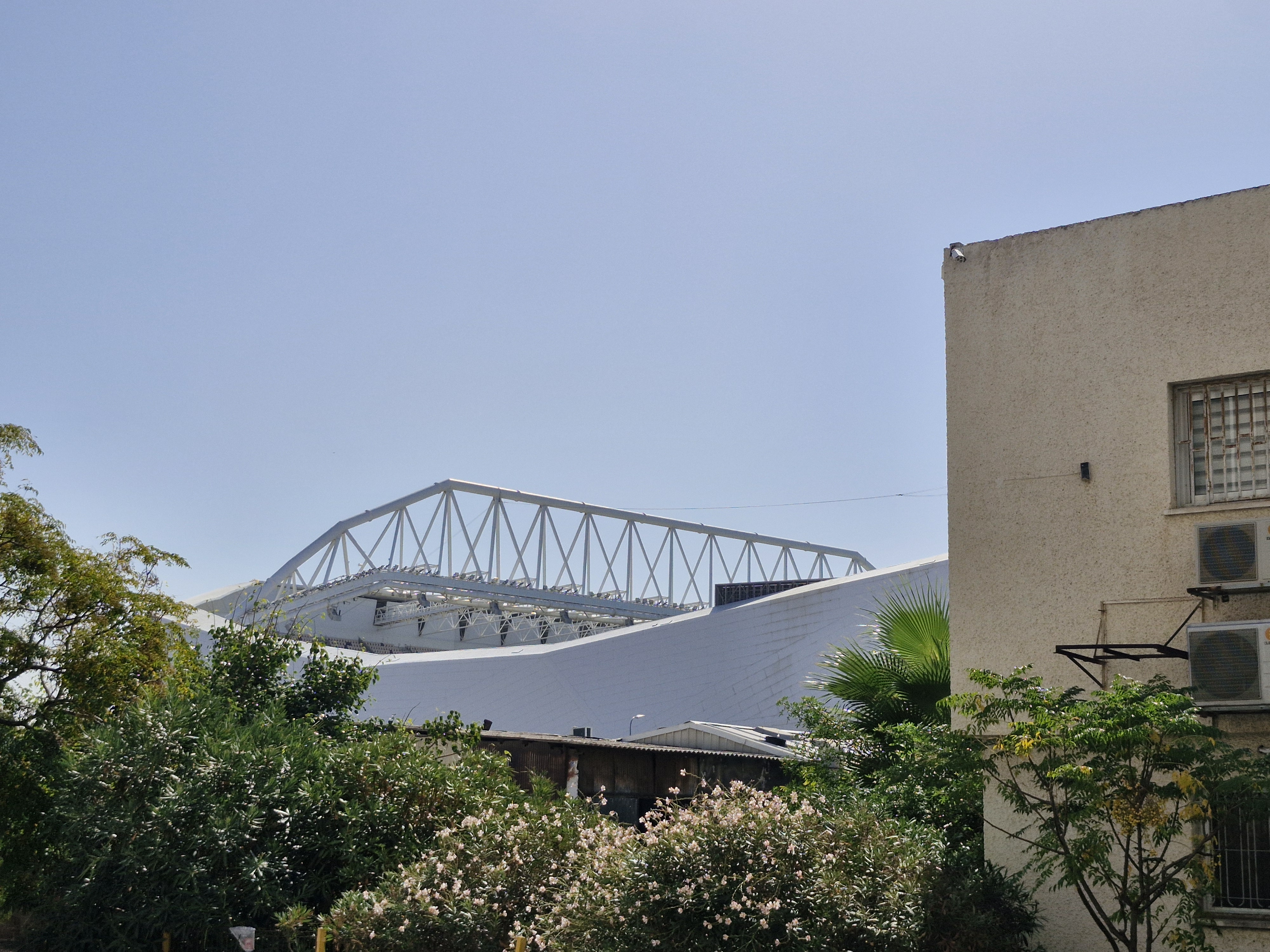
Bloomfield Stadium

After playing at three different stadiums, the club moved to the Basa Stadium in 1950.

== Supporters and politics ==
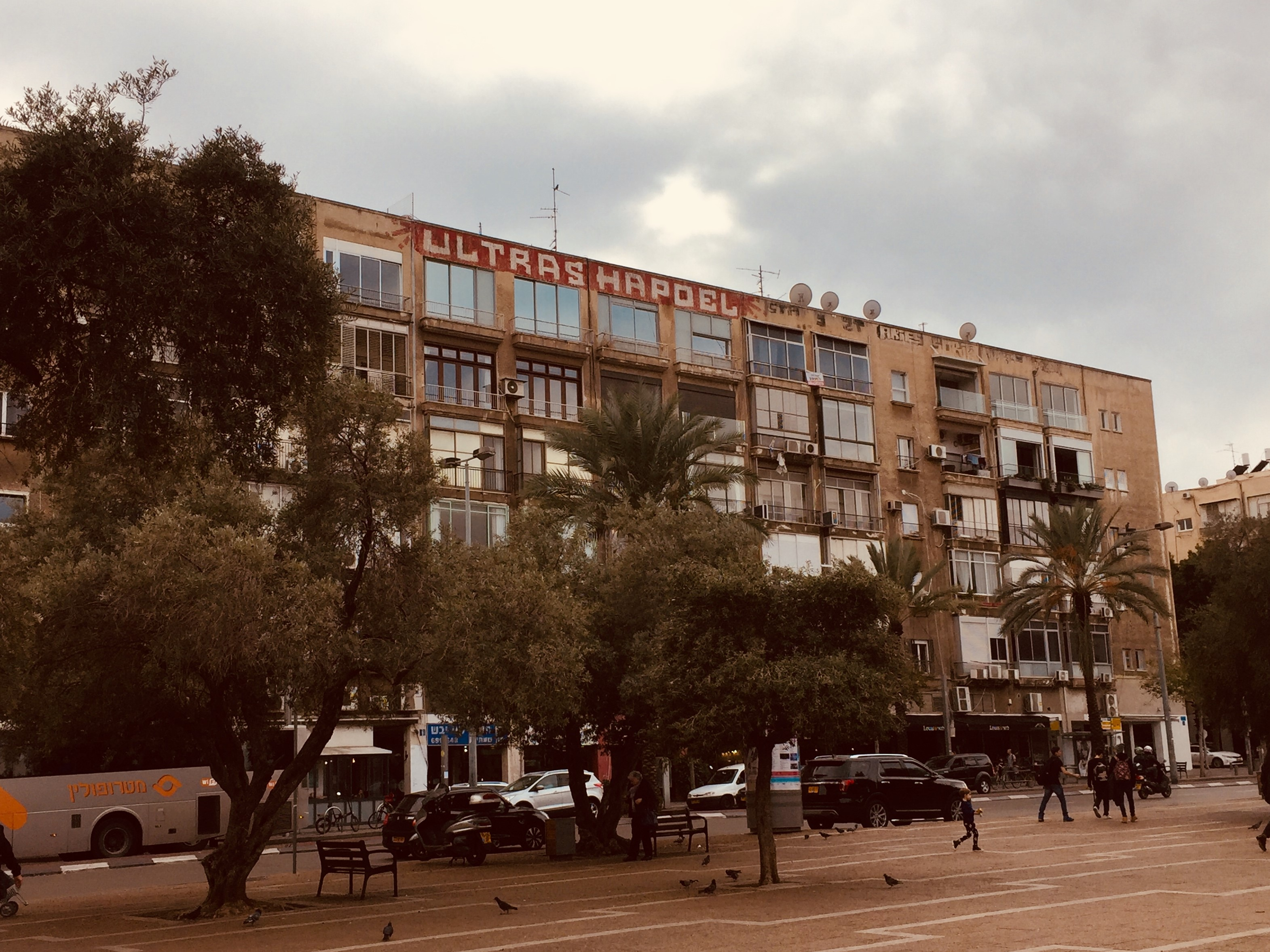
Ultras Hapoel Graffiti near Rabin Square, Tel Aviv

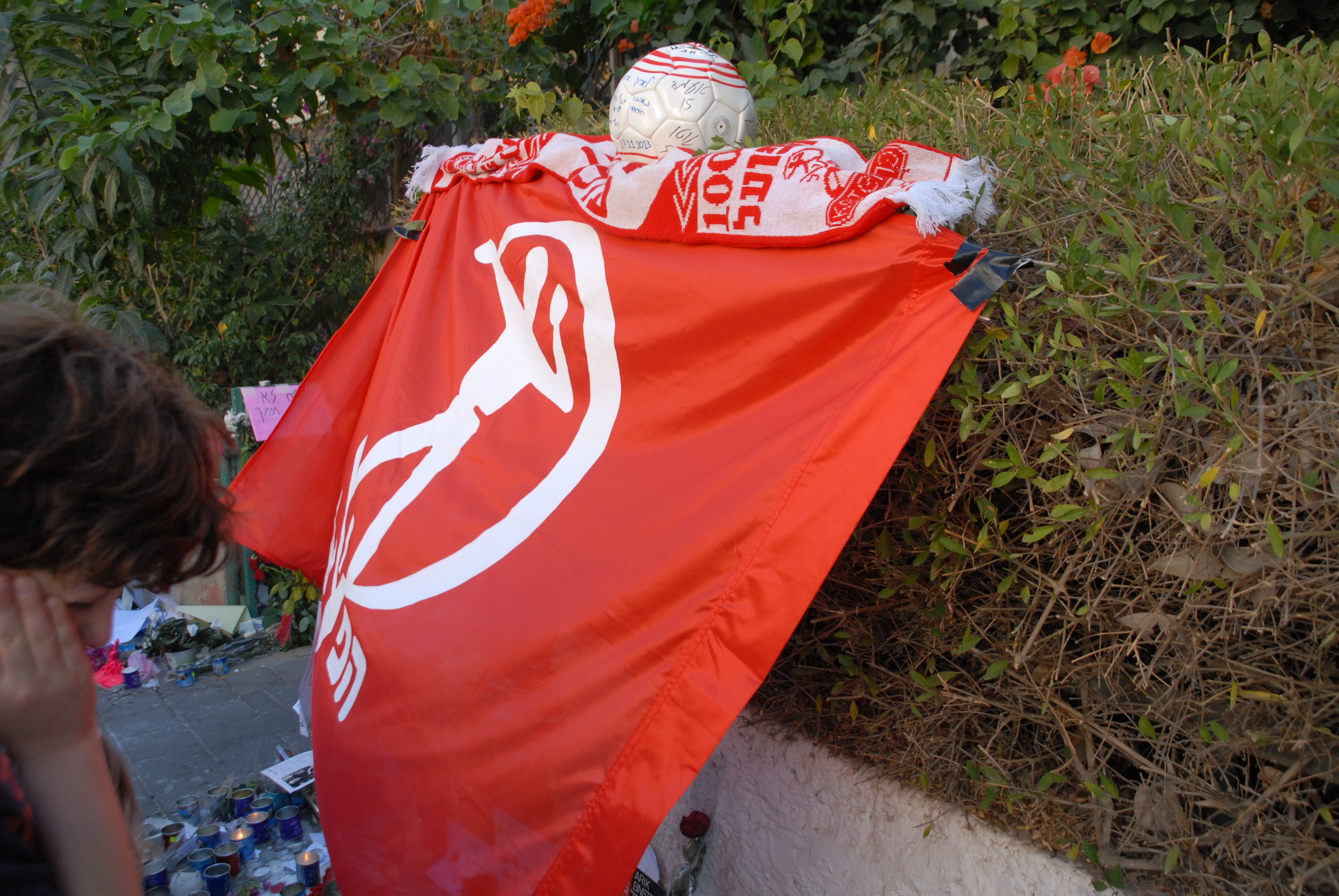
Flag of Hapoel Tel Aviv next to Arik Einstein's house, placed after his death in 2013.

The club is the standard-bearer of the Israeli left. It was the last club to cut formal links with politics, in this case the trade union movement and the moderate Social Democratic Labor Party Mapai, as well more radical parties such as the Marxist Party Mapam, its predecessor Hashomer Hatzair Workers Party, and the Marxist-Leninist Israeli Communist Party (Maki).

Ultras Hapoel often wave flags emblazoned with the faces of Che Guevara and Karl Marx, as well as banners with the slogan "Workers of the world, unite!" The club ultras has friendships with many other antifa supporter groups, including strong bonds with fans of FC St. Pauli, Standard Liège and Omonia Nicosia. In May 2013 Ultras' members founded the band "Lea Katmin" which sang songs from the stands of the fans.

A Haaretz poll published in June 2011 identified Hapoel Tel Aviv as the second most popular football team among Israeli Arabs, behind Maccabi Haifa.

Another survey had been conducted in March 2012 by Yedioth showed that Hapoel is the fourth most popular team among Israeli football fans (nineteen percent). The same survey revealed that thirty-two percent of Tel Aviv residents support the team.

== Rivalries ==
=== Rivalry with Maccabi Tel Aviv ===
Hapoel's main rivals are Maccabi Tel Aviv, whose rivalry is known as the Tel Aviv derby.

=== Rivalry with Beitar Jerusalem ===
Another rivalry with Beitar Jerusalem which is a political rivalry, which is considered (and considers itself) the team of the Israeli far-right.

== Players ==
=== Current squad ===
As of 16 September 2026

No.	Pos.	Nation	Player
1	GK	ISR	Dor Binyamini
4	DF	BRA	Chico
5	DF	CGO	Fernand Mayembo (captain)
6	MF	BUL	Andrian Kraev
7	FW	ISR	Roy Korine
8	MF	ISR	Yonatan Ferber
9	FW	GHA	Emmanuel Boateng
11	MF	ISR	Stav Turiel
14	MF	ISR	El Yam Kancepolsky
15	MF	ISR	Roei Alkukin
16	DF	ISR	Doron Leidner
17	MF	ISR	Itay Shavit
18	DF	ISR	Tal Archel

No.	Pos.	Nation	Player
19	FW	ISR	Anas Mahamid
21	DF	ISR	Shahar Piven
22	GK	ISR	Assaf Tzur
23	MF	ISR	Amit Lemkin
27	FW	ISR	Mor Buskila
32	DF	SUR	Yannick Leliendal
33	GK	ISR	Yanel Bazadog
35	MF	GHA	Douglas Owusu
44	FW	ISR	Daniel Dappa
51	FW	ISR	Omri Altman
77	FW	ISR	Omri Levy
97	DF	GLP	Marcus Coco
98	MF	BRA	Falcão

=== Players out on loan ===
No.	Pos.	Nation	Player
—	GK	ISR	Ido Sharon (at Ironi Tiberias until 30 June 2027)
—	DF	ISR	Or Israelov (at Hapoel Petah Tikva until 30 June 2027)
—	DF	ISR	Avi Turgeman (at Maccabi Herzliya until 30 June 2027)
—	DF	ISR	Yishay Brosh (at Hapoel Kfar Saba until 30 June 2027)
—	DF	ISR	Elay Mori (at Maccabi Jaffa until 30 June 2027)
—	DF	ISR	Gyorgei Kopraba (at Ironi Modi'in until 30 June 2027)
—	DF	ISR	Ofer Gelbard (at Hapoel Kfar Saba until 30 June 2027)

No.	Pos.	Nation	Player
—	MF	ISR	Ari Cohen (at Ironi Tiberias until 30 June 2027)
—	MF	ISR	Ron Talmi (at Maccabi Jaffa until 30 June 2027)
—	MF	ISR	Rani Zeevi (at Maccabi Jaffa until 30 June 2027)
—	MF	ISR	Idan Baranes (at Hapoel Ramat Gan until 30 June 2027)
—	MF	ISR	Sagi Genis (at Maccabi Herzliya until 30 June 2027)
—	MF	ISR	Ravid Olezki (at Hapoel Kfar Saba until 30 June 2027)
—	FW	ISR	Ofek Mishan (at Maccabi Herzliya until 30 June 2027)

=== Youth Sector ===
No.	Pos.	Nation	Player
—	GK	DEN	Ben Sørensen
—	GK	ISR	Guy Bar
—	GK	ISR	Dan Erez
—	GK	ISR	Yanel Bazadog
—	DF	ISR	Elad Ben Shimon
—	DF	ISR	Shay Vaxman
—	DF	ISR	Yuval Paz Tondovsky
—	DF	ISR	Guy Aligolashvili
—	DF	ISR	Emanuel Zauda
—	DF	ISR	Ido Aharon
—	MF	ISR	Itamar Chosyd
—	MF	ISR	Ofek Chiproot

No.	Pos.	Nation	Player
—	MF	ISR	Fuad Ganayem
—	MF	ISR	Noam Nuna
—	MF	ISR	Noam Dabarashvili
—	MF	ISR	Nehay Bergman
—	MF	ISR	Idan Kapellner Rabinovitz
—	MF	ISR	Roi Ohana
—	MF	ISR	Macay Benbenisti
—	FW	ISR	Noam George
—	FW	ISR	Or Messika
—	FW	ISR	Hisham Taha
—	FW	ISR	Alon Moskovich
—	FW	ISR	Omri Levy

=== Foreigners 2026–27 ===
In the 2026–27 season of the Israeli Premier League, each club is permitted to register up to eight foreign players in its senior squad. All eight registered foreign players are eligible to participate in a match simultaneously. This regulation marks an increase from previous seasons, in which clubs were limited to six foreign players. Players who hold Israeli citizenship or permanent residency, including those eligible through Jewish ancestry, marriage to an Israeli citizen, or long-term residence and participation in Israeli football, are classified as Israeli players and are not counted toward the foreign player quota.

- (Republic of the Congo) Fernand Mayembo
- (Brazil) Falcão
- (Brazil) Chico
- (Bulgaria) Andrian Kraev
- (Guadeloupe) Marcus Coco
- (Ghana) Emmanuel Boateng
- (Ghana) Douglas Owusu
- (Suriname) Yannick Leliendal

=== Club Captains ===
Years	Name
1951	(Israel) Shimon Zimmerman (MF)
1967	(Israel) Haim Nurieli (MF)
1971	(Israel) Shimon Ben Yehonathan (DF)
1972–1979	(Israel) Yehoshua Feigenbaum (FW)
1983–1987	(Israel) Moshe Sinai (MF)
1990	(Israel) Yaakov Ekhoiz (DF)
1993–1994	(Israel) Haim Revivo (MF)
1994–1995	(Israel) Ya'akov Schwartz (MF)
1995–1997	(Israel) Guy Sharabi (DF)
1997–1999	(Israel) Felix Halfon (DF)
1999–2006	(Israel) Shimon Gershon (DF)
2006–2007	(Israel) Yossi Abuksis (MF)
2007–2013	(Israel) Walid Badir (DF)
2013–2015	(Israel) Shay Abutbul (MF)
2015–2016	(Romania) Mihai Pintilii (MF)
2016	(Israel) Ariel Harush (GK) (Montenegro) Nemanja Nikolić (MF)
2016–2018	(Israel) Avihai Yadin (MF)
2018–2020	(Israel) Orel Dgani (DF)
2020–2021	(Israel) Omri Altman (MF)
2021-2024	(Israel) Dan Einbinder (MF)
2024-2025	(Serbia) Goran Antonić (DF) (Israel) Robi Levkovich (GK)
2025-	(Republic of the Congo) Fernand Mayembo (DF)

== Notable former players ==
=== Most appearances ===
Position	Name	Period	Games	Goals
1	(Israel) Ya'akov Ekhoiz	1974–92	454	12
2	(Israel) Aryeh Bajareno	1968–85	430	0
3	(Israel) Yehoshua Feigenbaum	1964–79	368	142
4	(Israel) Yigal Antebi	1999–09 2012-14	351	9
5	(Israel) Shavit Elimelech	1996–07	344	0
6	(Israel) Yaakov Rahaminovich	1966–80	332	30
7	(Israel) Yehezkel Chazom	1964–77	324	97

=== Most League Goals ===
Position	Name	Period	Games	Goals
1	(Israel) Yehoshua Feigenbaum	1964–79	368	142
2	(Israel) Yehezkel Chazom	1964–77	324	97
3	(Israel) Moshe Sinai	1980–89 1990-93	290	87
4	(Israel) Rehavia Rozenbaum	1951–65		78
5	(Israel) Omer Damari	2011–14 2018-2020	115	59
6	(Israel) Shabtay Levi	1977–88	247	58
7	(Israel) Gidon Tish	1955-66 1968-69		55

== Coaches and Management ==
Coaching staff
(Israel) Elyaniv Barda	Head Coach
(Israel) Salim Tuama (Spain) David Semenigo Garcia (Israel) Avichai Kalif	Assistant Coaches
(Israel) Jenia Dunayev	Goalkeeping Coach
(Israel) Ofer Nir	Head of Data and Analysis
(Israel) Tal Enoch	Chief Analyst
(Israel) Yarden Ashkenazi	Analyst
Fitness coaches
(Spain) Julio Martinez	Fitness Coach
(Israel) Tal Wilik	Fitness Coach
Medical department
(Israel) Dr. Yariv Preiss	Team doctor
(Israel) Dr. Nagib Shaker	Team doctor
(Israel) Tomer Basan	Physiotherapists
(Israel) Alon Magdasi	Physiotherapists
(Israel) Yair Shneor	Sports therapists
(Israel) Dan Safrrari	Sports therapists
(Israel) Asi Alcidavi	Masseur
Sport management and Organisation
(Israel) Guy Primor	Chief Executive Officer
(Israel) Omer Buchsenbaum	Technical Director
(Bulgaria) Ivan Slavov	Chief Scout
(Israel) Maor Ben Chaim	Logistics
(Israel) Ben Cohen	Logistics
(Israel) Noa Shneitzer	Nutritionist
(Israel) Maor Asaf	Team Chef

== Coach history ==
- (Israel) Monia Goldstein (1947–??)
- (Israel) Musta Poliakov (1949–??)
- (Israel) Zvi Erlich (1950–??)
- (Socialist Federal Republic of Yugoslavia) Ivan Jazbinšek (1956–57)
- (Israel) Edmond Schmilovich (1958–60)
- (Hungary) Jenő Kalmár (1960–62)
- (England) Harry Game (1963–64)
- (Israel) David Schweitzer (1965–66)
- (Israel) Yosef Merimovich (1966–68)
- (Israel) Rehavia Rosenbaum (1968–70)
- (England) Harry Game (1971–74)
- (Israel) Shimon Ben Yehonathan (1974–75)
- (Israel) Rehavia Rosenbaum (1975–76)
- (Israel) Yosef Merimovich (1977–79)
- (Israel) David Schweitzer (1980–82)
- (Israel) Zvi Rosen (1982–83)
- (Israel) Mordechai Spiegler (1984)
- (Israel) David Schweitzer (1986–87)
- (Israel) David Schweitzer (1989–90)
- (Israel) Shimon Shenhar (1990)
- (Israel) Moshe Sinai (1991–96)
- (Israel) Ya'akov Grundman (1992)
- (Israel) Yehoshua Feigenbaum (1993–94)
- (Israel) Dror Kashtan (1 July 1996 – 30 June 1997)
- (Israel) Eli Cohen (1 July 1997 – 30 June 1999)
- (Israel) Dror Kashtan (1 July 1999 – 30 June 2004)
- (Israel) Gili Landau (June 2004 – 4 Dec)
- (Israel) Shmuel Hanin (15 Nov 2004 – 31 Dec 2004)
- (Israel) Yehoshua Feigenbaum (Dec 2004 – 5 June 2005)
- (Israel) Dror Kashtan (1 July 2005 – 31 Dec 2005)
- (Israel) Itzhak Shum (1 July 2006 – 31 Dec 2006)
- (Israel) Nir Levine (Dec 2006 – 7 June 2007)
- (Israel) Guy Luzon (1 July 2007 – 15 Jan 2008)
- (Israel) Eli Guttman (Dec 2007 – 25 May 2011)
- (Israel) Dror Kashtan (4 June 2011 – 9 Jan 2012)
- (Israel) Nitzan Shirazi (11 Jan 2012 – Sept 27, 2012)
- (Israel) Yossi Abukasis (Sept 27, 2012 – 17 Feb 2013)
- (Israel) Freddy David (18 Feb 2013 – 18 May 2013)
- (Israel) Ran Ben Shimon (20 May 2013 – 26 May 2014)
- (Israel) Asi Domb (26 May 2014 – 24 January 2015)
- (Israel) Eli Cohen (24 January 2015 – 5 November 2015)
- (Israel) Guy Levy (5 November 2015 – January 2016)
- (Israel) Eli Guttman (January 2016 – September 2016)
- (Israel) Guy Luzon (September 2016 – 11 January 2017)
- (Israel) Meni Koretski (11 January 2017 – 16 May 2017)
- (Israel) Moti Ivanir (26 May 2017 – 26 October 2017)
- (Israel) Kobi Refua (30 October 2017 - 26 November 2018)
- (Israel) Ofir Haim (27 November 2018 - 6 January 2019)
- (Israel) Kobi Refua (7 January 2019 - 16 May 2019)
- (Israel) Nisso Avitan (16 May 2019 - 5 November 2019)
- (Israel) Nir Klinger (5 November 2019 - 19 December 2021)
- (Israel) Kobi Refua (19 December 2021 - 18 September 2022)
- (Israel) Slobodan Drapić (19 September 2022 - 10 January 2023)
- (Israel) Haim Silvas (11 January 2023 - 16 May 2023)
- (Australia) Michael Valkanis (4 June 2023 - 30 October 2023)
- (Spain) Borja Lema (30 October 2023 - 27 January 2024)
- (Israel) Salim Tuama (Interim) (27 January 2024 - 6 February 2024)
- (Israel) Yossi Abukasis (6 February 2024 - 28 April 2024)
- (Israel) Salim Tuama (Interim) (28 April 2024 - 2 June 2024)
- (Israel) Messay Dego (2 June 2024 - 9 December 2024)
- (Israel) Elyaniv Barda (9 December 2024 -

== Honours ==
=== Domestic ===
==== League ====
Honour	No.	Years
Championships	13	1933–34, 1934–35, 1938–39, 1940, 1943–44, 1956–57, 1965–66, 1968–69, 1980–81, 1985–86, 1987–88, 1999–2000, 2009–10

==== Cups ====
Honour	No.	Years
State Cup	16	1928, 1934, 1937, 1938, 1939, 1944, 1960–61, 1971–72, 1982–83, 1998–99, 1999–2000, 2005–06, 2006–07, 2009–10, 2010–11, 2011–12
Toto Cup (top division)	2	2001–02, 2026-27
Super Cup	5	1957, 1966, 1969, 1970, 1981

=== International ===
Honour	No.	Years
AFC Champions League	1/1	Winner:1967 Runners-up:1970

=== Other ===
Honour	No.	Years
Shapira Cup	1	1954–55

=== Youth Division ===
Honour	No.	Years
Israeli Noar Premier League	5	1944–45, 1965–66, 1977–78, 1980–81, 1989–90
Israel Youth State Cup	8	1959–60, 1967–68, 1985–86, 1989–90, 1991–92, 2008–09, 2014–15, 2018–19

== International Records ==
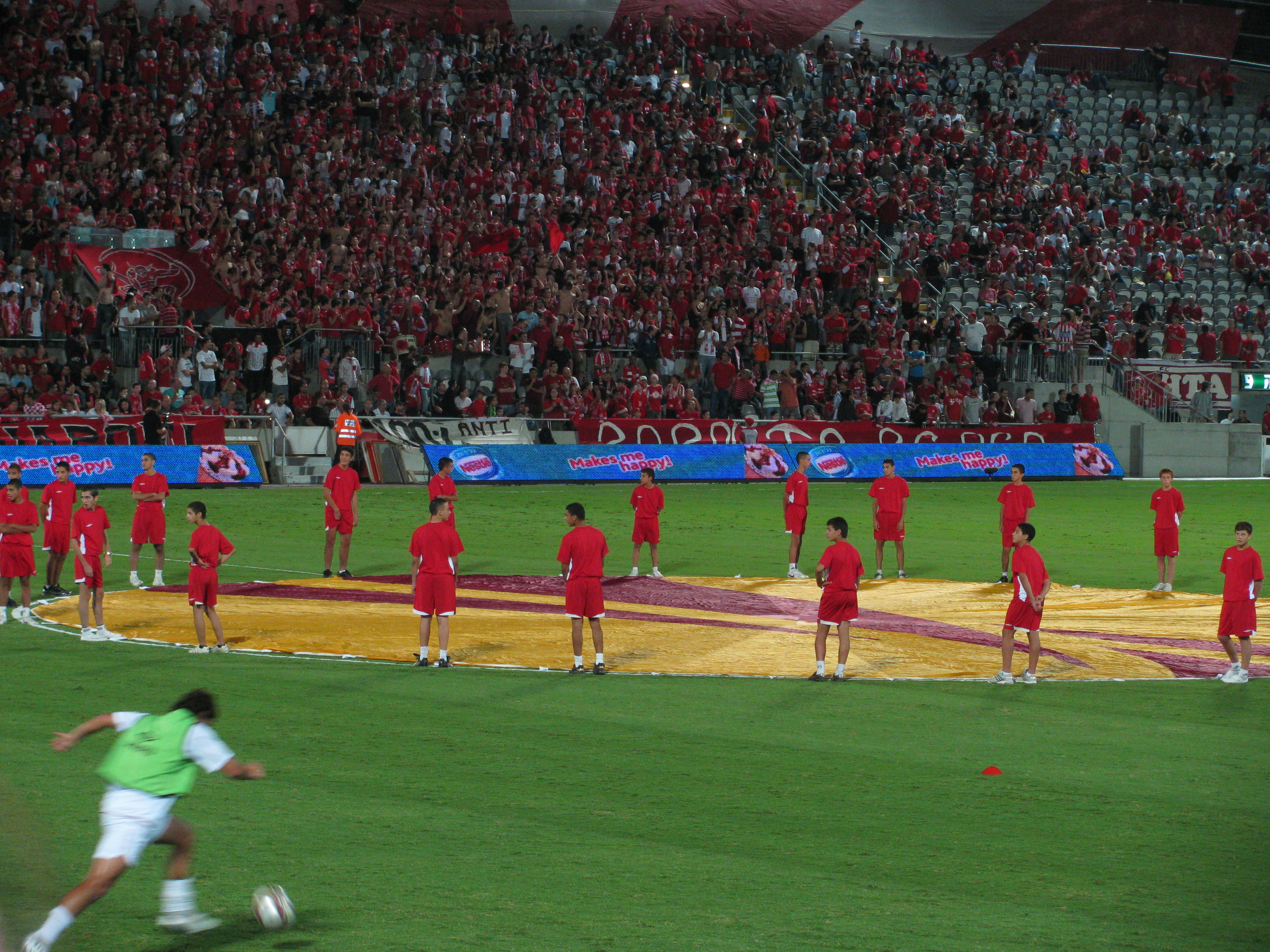
UEFA Europa League match against Rapid Wien at Bloomfield Stadium, 2009

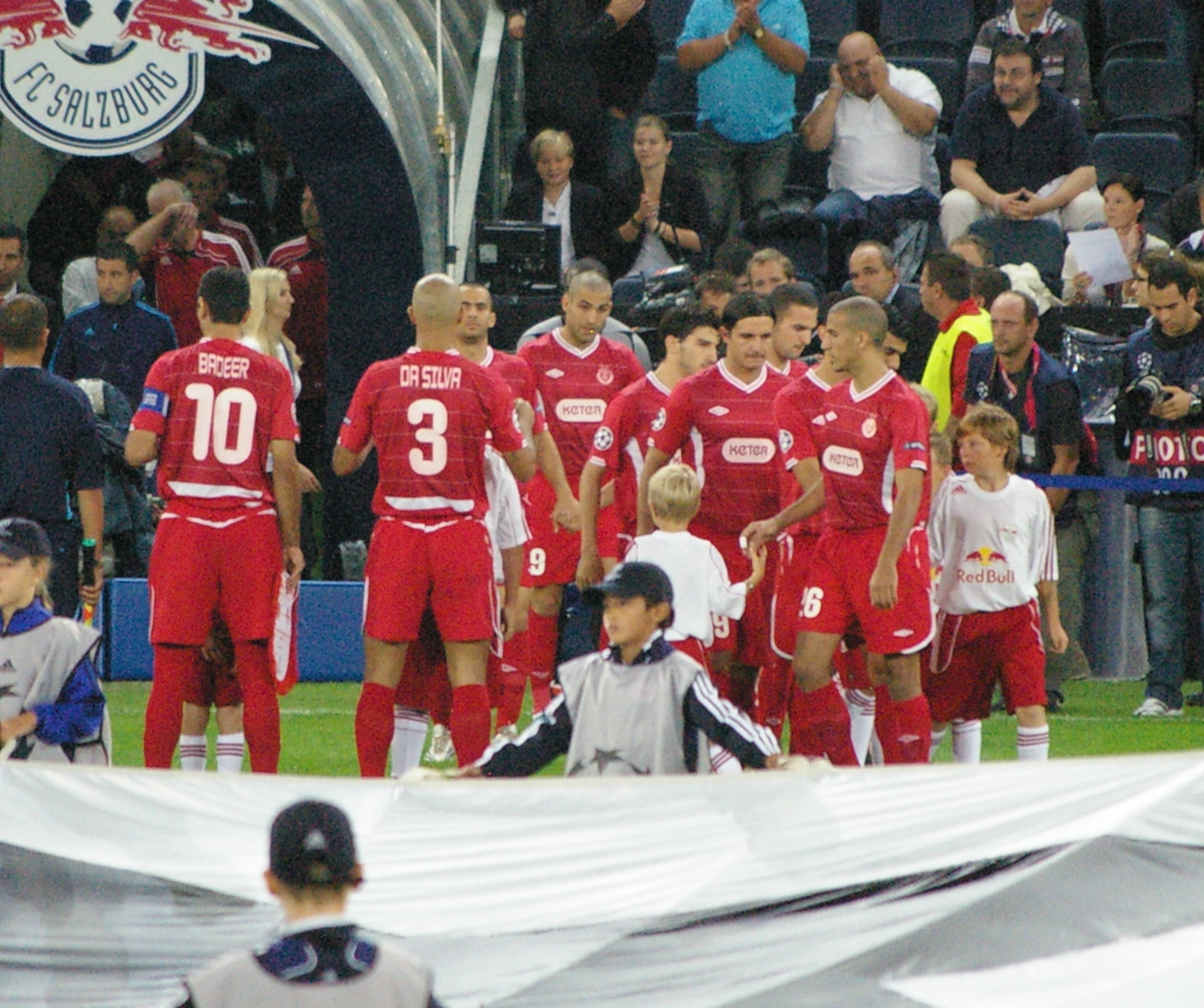
UEFA Champions League qualifying match against Red Bull Salzburg, 2010

=== European competitions ===
- UEFA Champions League
  - Group stage: 2010–11
- UEFA Europa League
  - Quarter-finals: 2001–02
  - Round of 32: 2006–07, 2009–10
  - Group stage: 2007–08, 2011–12, 2012–13

=== Asian competitions ===
- Asian Champion Club Tournament
  - Winners (1): 1967

Achievements
Preceded by Inaugural Champions	Champions of Asia; 1967	Succeeded by Maccabi Tel Aviv (Israel)
