= David Schweitzer =

Israeli footballer and manager (1925–1997)

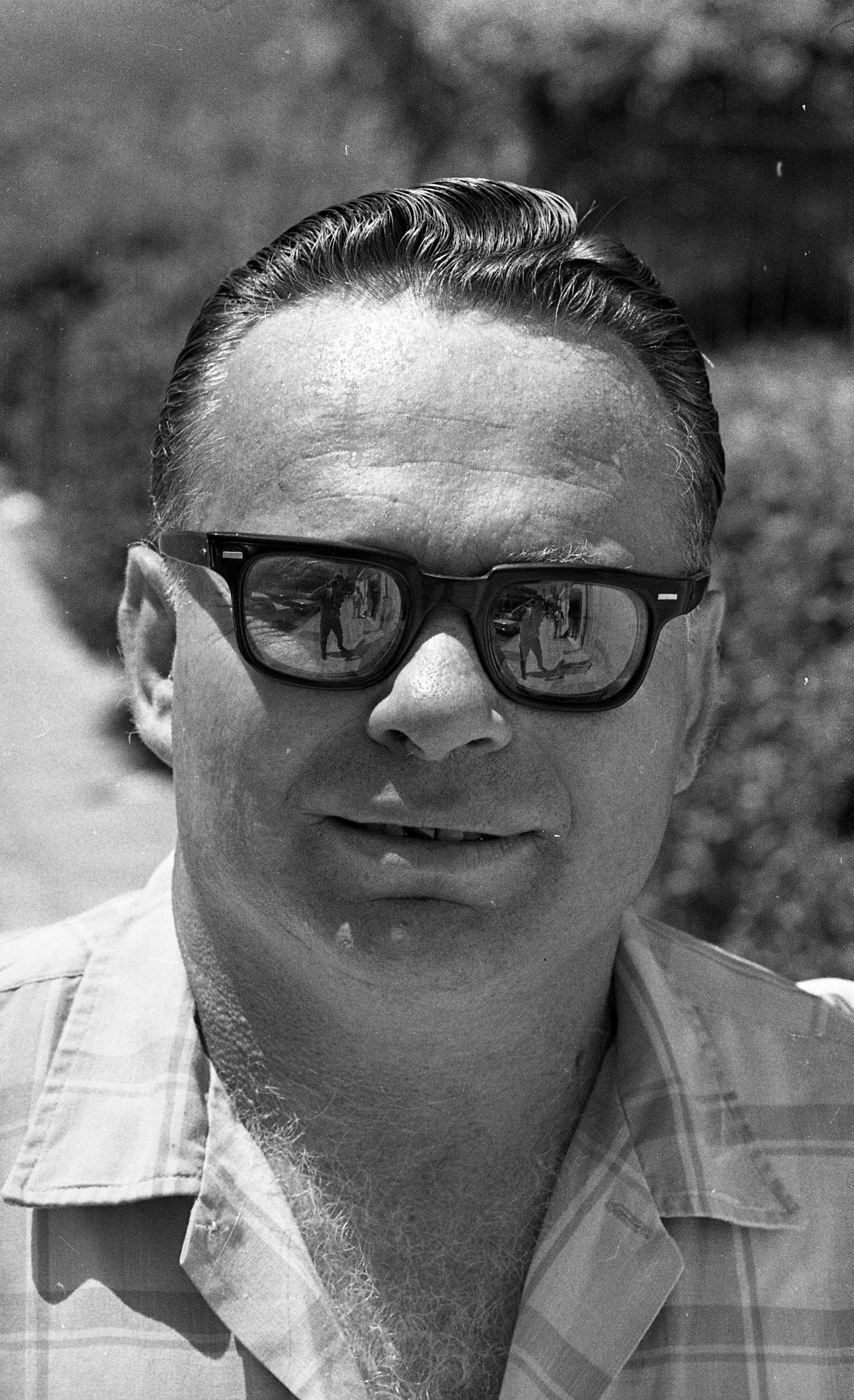
- Schweitzer in 1969

Personal information
- Date of birth: 18 July 1925
- Place of birth: Tel Aviv, Mandatory Palestine
- Date of death: 17 August 1997 (aged 72)
- Position: Midfielder

Senior career*
Years	Team	Apps	(Gls)
- Hapoel Tel Aviv
- Hapoel Haifa
- Hapoel Kiryat Haim

International career
1949–1954	Israel	6	(0)

Managerial career
- 1973–1977: Israel
- 1992: Maccabi Jaffa
- * Club domestic league appearances and goals

David Schweitzer (Hebrew: דוד שוויצר; 18 July 1925 – 17 August 1997) was an Israeli football player and manager who was active at both professional and international levels.

== Career ==
=== Playing career ===
Schweitzer started his athletic career as a basketball player with Hapoel Tel Aviv, before switching to football. During his time with Hapoel Haifa, Schweitzer took coaching courses and served as the youth team coach, and transferred to Hapoel Kiryat Haim, where he acted as player-coach.

Schweitzer made six appearances for the Israel national team between 1949 and 1954.

=== Coaching career ===
Schweitzer managed the Israel national team between 1973 and 1977.

He also managed club side Maccabi Jaffa in 1992.
