= Guy Sharabi =

Israeli footballer

Guy Sharabi גיא שרעבי
Personal information
- Full name: Guy Sharabi
- Date of birth: March 20, 1969 (age 57)
- Place of birth: Tel Aviv, Israel
- Position: Defender

Youth career
- Bnei Yehuda Tel Aviv

Senior career*
Years	Team	Apps	(Gls)
1986–1994	Bnei Yehuda Tel Aviv	182	(7)
1994–1997	Hapoel Tel Aviv		
1997–1998	Maccabi Ironi Ashdod		
1998–2000	Maccabi Netanya		
2000–2001	Hapoel Ashkelon		
2001–2002	Hapoel Jerusalem		

International career
1992	Israel	2	(0)
- * Club domestic league appearances and goals

Guy Sharabi (Hebrew: גיא שרעבי) is an Israeli former footballer who represented the Israel national football team and is one of the biggest icons of Bnei Yehuda Tel Aviv there he was part of the team that won the historic 1989-90 Israeli championship.

== Honours ==
- Israeli Championships
  - Winner (1): 1989-90
  - Runner-up (2): 1986–87, 1991–92
- Toto Cup
  - Winner (1): 1991-92
