= Harry Game =

English football manager (1923–2017)

Personal information
- Date of birth: 20 September 1923
- Place of birth: England
- Date of death: 26 March 2017 (aged 93)
- Place of death: Norfolk, England
- Position: Defender

Senior career*
Years	Team	Apps	(Gls)
	Cardiff City	0	(0)
–1948	Millwall	0	(0)
1948	Crystal Palace	0	(0)
Total		0	(0)

Managerial career
- 1951–1953: Panathinaikos
- 1953–1960: Royal Antwerp
- 1960–1963: Panathinaikos
- 1963–1964: Hapoel Tel Aviv
- 1965–1968: Royal Antwerp
- 19??–1971: Hellenic
- 1972–1974: Hapoel Tel Aviv
- * Club domestic league appearances and goals

Harry Game (20 September 1923 – 26 March 2017) was an English footballer and manager.

== Playing career ==
As a footballer, Game played as a defender for Crystal Palace, Millwall, and Cardiff City, but was forced to retire at the age of 24, following an injury to his meniscus and knee ligaments.

During World War II, he served as a soldier with the Royal Air Force, where he was given physical training.

== Managerial career ==
Following his injury, Game began to take Football Association coaching courses. In 1951, he was appointed the manager of Greek club Panathinaikos after being recommended by England national team manager Walter Winterbottom. There, he won the Panhellenic Championship in the 1952–53 season. However, his wife believed that with two children, and a third on the way, they would be better off living closer to the United Kingdom, resulting in him leaving Panathinaikos at the end of the season.

That same year, Belgian club Royal Antwerp were looking for a British manager, as the club believed English football was the best in the world at the time. Through connections with the FA, Game was hired. In 1955, he helped Antwerp win the Belgian Cup, beating Waterschei Thor in the final, before winning the 1956–57 Belgian First Division title two years later, becoming the youngest football manager to win both a league and cup title in Belgium. He remained in charge of Royal Antwerp until 1960, when he returned to Panathinaikos.

He spent three years in Greece, where he won two more league titles. In 1965, Game returned to Antwerp, with the club on the decline due to the rise in professionalism and the board wanting to remain an amateur team. At the end of the 1967–68 season, he oversaw the club's first ever relegation, before resigning from his role on 3 May 1968.

After leaving Royal Antwerp, he was appointed the manager of Hellenic FC in South Africa, where he was succeeded by George Eastham Sr. in 1971. However, despite his previous success in Greece and Belgium, teams in the English Third and Fourth Divisions were rejecting him, with one club saying that despite his previous success, he had no chance as "no one knew who the hell he was". In 1972, he joined Israeli club Hapoel Tel Aviv.

== Personal life and death ==
Game was married, and had three children. He died in Norfolk on 26 March 2017, following a short illness at the age of 93.
