= Borja Lema =

Spanish football manager

Personal information
- Full name: Borja Lema Benito
- Date of birth: 7 November 1990 (age 36)
- Place of birth: Madrid, Spain

Managerial career
- Years: Team
- 2015–2016: Jove Español
- 2016–2017: Rayo Ibense (A.Coach of Pepe De La Sagra)
- 2017–2018: I-Shou University (Head Coach)
- 2018-2019: Club Atletico de Madrid (Coach, Responsible of Methodology)
- 2019-2020: LaLiga Academy Russia (Technical Director)
- 2021–2022: Hapoel Be'er Sheva (Head Coach, Youth)
- 2021-2022: Beitar Tel Aviv Batyam (A.Coach of Carlos García)
- 2022–2023: Hapoel Kfar Saba (A.Coach of Omer Peretz)
- 2023–2024: Hapoel Tel Aviv (A.Coach of Michael Valkanis)
- 2023–2024: Hapoel Tel Aviv (Head Coach)
- 2024–2025: Adana Demirspor (A.Coach of Michael Valkanis)
- 2025–2026: Brisbane Roar FC (A.Coach of Michael Valkanis)

Borja Lema (born 7 November 1990) is a UEFA Pro football manager who coached in Hapoel Tel Aviv during 23/24 season.

== Manager career ==
Lema started to coach football club in different clubs in Spain, he worked in several roles combining head coaching in youth and assistant/analyst/strength & conditioning Coach in adults. Later on he got the opportunity to work in different countries and develop LaLiga Methodology. In 2017 managed I-Shou University from China and then signed to the Atlético Madrid Juvenil's staff.

In 2021 appointment as Hapoel Be'er Sheva's youth manager. On 31 January 2022 signed to the assistant of Carlos García in Beitar Tel Aviv Bat Yam. In the next season worked as assistant of Omer Peretz in Hapoel Kfar Saba.

In summer 2023 signed as assistant in the Israeli Premier League club Hapoel Tel Aviv. After 4 months became the head coach after Michael Valkanis left to AFC Ajax.

On July 8, 2024, Adana Demirspor announced Michael Valkanis had been appointed as manager and Lema was his Assistant on a one-year deal with a one-year option.[12] They were able to get 1 point in the first 6 weeks of the season with the narrow squad. On September 23, 2024, the club announced that they parted ways with Valkanis and his Staff.

On May 5, 2025, Lema was appointed Assistant Coach of Michael Valkanis for the 2025-26 A-League Season for Brisbane Roar FC.
