= Haim Nurieli =

Israeli footballer (1943–2022)

Personal information
- Date of birth: 1 May 1943
- Date of death: 14 September 2022 (aged 79)
- Position: Midfielder

Senior career*
| Years | Team | Apps | (Gls) |
| 1960–1969 | Hapoel Tel Aviv | 194 | (38) |
| 1969–1970 | Shimshon Tel Aviv | | |
| 1970 | Ajax | | |

International career
| 1965–1968 | Israel | 3 | (0) |
- * Club domestic league appearances and goals

Haim Nurieli (Hebrew: חיים נוריאלי; 1 May 1943 – 14 September 2022) was an Israeli footballer. He played in three matches for the Israel national football team from 1965 to 1968.
