= Yitzhak Englander =

Israeli footballer

Yitzhak Englander יצחק אנגלנדר
Personal information
- Date of birth: 30 April 1946 (age 80)
- Place of birth: Budapest, Hungary

International career
Years	Team	Apps	(Gls)
- Israel

Yitzhak Englander (Hebrew: יצחק אנגלנדר; born 30 April 1946) is an Israeli former footballer. He competed in the men's tournament at the 1968 Summer Olympics.
