= Máximo Levi =

Israeli footballer

Personal information
- Full name: Máximo Levi
- Date of birth: 8 January 1996 (age 30)
- Place of birth: Buenos Aires, Argentina
- Height: 1.82 m (5 ft 11 1/2 in)
- Positions: Right-back; centre-back

Team information
- Current team: Almirante Brown

Senior career*
Years	Team	Apps	(Gls)
2017	Soberano Zamora Fútbol Club		
2018	Cafetaleros de Chiapas	0	(0)
2018–2019	Tristán Suárez	24	(0)
2019–2021	Los Andes	18	(1)
2021–2024	Belgrano	76	(0)
2024	Hapoel Be'er Sheva	9	(0)
2024–2025	San Martín de Tucumán	15	(0)
2025–	Almirante Brown	26	(0)
- * Club domestic league appearances and goals as of 17:25, 22 April 2026 (UTC)

Máximo Levi (Hebrew: מקסימו לוי; born 8 January 1996) is an Argentine-Israeli professional footballer who plays as a defender for Almirante Brown.

== Club career ==
On 17 January 2024 signed for Israeli Premier League club Hapoel Be'er Sheva.
