= Abed Yassin =

Palestinian footballer

Personal information
- Full name: Abed Abdelhadi Yassin
- Date of birth: 9 May 2004 (age 22)
- Place of birth: Shefa-Amr, Israel
- Height: 1.84 m (6 ft 0 in)
- Position: Goalkeeper

Youth career
- Bnei Sakhnin

Senior career*
Years	Team	Apps	(Gls)
2023–2026	Bnei Sakhnin	13	(0)

International career^{‡}
2023	Palestine U23	9	(0)
2025–	Palestine	2	(0)
- * Club domestic league appearances and goals ‡ National team caps and goals as of 28 September 2026

Abed Abdelhadi Yassin (Arabic: عبد عبد الهادي ياسين; born 9 May 2004) is a Palestinian professional footballer who plays as a goalkeeper for the Palestine national team.

== Club career ==
Yassin began his senior career with the Israeli Premier League club Bnei Sakhnin in 2023.

== International career ==
Yassin was born in Israel to Palestinian parents and holds dual Palestinian and Israeli citizenship. He was called up to the Palestine national team in November 2025, and as a result his club Bnei Sakhnin controversially decided to exclude him from the first team thereafter. He debuted with Palestine in a friendly 3–0 loss to the Basque Country on 16 November 2025.
