= 1939–40 in Mandatory Palestine football =

Football in Mandatory Palestine
- Season: 1939–40

The 1939–40 season was the 13th season of competitive football in the British Mandate for Palestine under the Eretz Israel Football Association.

== IFA Competitions ==
=== 1939 Palestine League ===
Matches of the 1939 Palestine League, which, due to the Arab Revolt, was split into regional leagues, rather than holding a national championship, were carried from the previous season, and were finished in fall 1939. Maccabi Tel Aviv and British Police won the Tel Aviv and Jerusalem divisions of top tier Liga Alef, while Hapoel Hadera, Beitar Tel Aviv and Maccabi Rehovot won their Liga Bet regional divisions.

=== 1940 Palestine League ===
Shortly after the conclusion of the previous league season, a new league season was held, starting on 3 February 1940. League matches were completed in early July 1940, with Hapoel Tel Aviv winning the championship.

==== League table ====
Pos	Team	Pld	W	D	L	GF	GA	GR	Pts	
1	Hapoel Tel Aviv	14	10	3	1	31	12	2.583	23	Champions
2	Beitar Tel Aviv	14	8	3	3	43	8	5.375	19	
3	Maccabi Tel Aviv	14	8	2	4	46	14	3.286	18	
4	Maccabi Nes Tziona	14	6	4	4	24	28	0.857	16	
5	Hapoel Haifa	14	5	2	7	22	34	0.647	12	
6	Hakoah Tel Aviv	14	4	4	6	12	25	0.480	12	
7	Maccabi Petah Tikva	14	5	0	9	32	42	0.762	10	
8	Hapoel Herzliya	14	0	2	12	6	53	0.113	2	

Updated to match(es) played on 29 June 1940. Source: 100 Years of Football 1906-2006, Elisha Shohat (Israel), 2006

==== Liga Bet ====
In Liga Bet, Hapoel Hadera, Degel Zion Tel Aviv and RSG Rehovot won their regional divisions. At the end of the season, Degel Zion, Hapoel Hadera and Hapoel Rishon LeZion (who finished as runners-up in the South division) competed for promotions to the top division, with Hapoel Rishon LeZion and Degel Zion winning promotion.

Pos	Team	Pld	W	D	L	GF	GA	GR	Pts	
1	Hapoel Rishon LeZion	4	3	1	0	8	3	2.667	7	Promotion to Liga Alef
2	Degel Zion Tel Aviv	4	2	0	2	10	5	2.000	4	Promotion to Liga Alef
3	Hapoel Hadera	4	0	1	3	2	12	0.167	1	

Updated to match(es) played on 18 August 1940. Source: 100 Years of Football 1906-2006, Elisha Shohat (Israel), 2006

==== Liga Gimel ====
For the first time the EIFA arranged a third division, which was divided into two regions, Samaria (North) and South. Among the teams participating in the league were future league champions Bnei Yehuda and Hapoel Kfar Saba, both making their debut in the league.

Only a handful of results are known. Maccabi Kfar Saba and Hakoach Rishon LeZion won the Samaria and South divisions and qualified along with their runners-up, Hapoel Kfar Saba and HaMa'avir Tel Aviv to the promotion play-offs, at the end which the top three teams were promoted to Liga Bet. However, as club registration for the following season was low, all third division clubs that registered to play were placed in Liga Bet.

Pos	Team	Pld	W	D	L	GF	GA	GR	Pts	
1	HaMa'avir Tel Aviv	6	4	0	2	12	8	1.500	8	Promotion to Liga Bet
2	HaKoah Rishon LeZion	6	2	2	2	12	13	0.923	6	Promotion to Liga Bet
3	Hapoel Kfar Saba	6	2	2	2	8	10	0.800	6	Promotion to Liga Bet
4	Maccabi Kfar Saba	6	1	2	3	7	8	0.875	4	

Updated to match(es) played on 18 August 1940. Source: 100 Years of Football 1906-2006, Elisha Shohat (Israel), 2006

=== 1940 Palestine Cup ===
Hapoel Tel Aviv, the defending cup holders were beaten by local rivals Maccabi Tel Aviv 0–4 in the semi-finals. In the final, Maccabi were beaten 1–3 by Beitar Tel Aviv.

18 May 1940

Maccabi Tel Aviv	1–3	Beitar Tel Aviv
Beit HaLevi 9'		Kretchman 6'; Bogdanov 60'; Panz 88'

Maccabiah Stadium
Attendance: 8000
Referee: Chodshoni

=== Jerusalem League ===
A five-team league was played in Jerusalem during spring 1940, with each team playing its opponents twice. Maccabi Bar Kochva Jerusalem won the league.

Pos	Team	Pld	W	D	L	GF	GA	GR	Pts	Qualification
1	Maccabi Jerusalem	8	6	2	0	17	5	3.400	14	League champions
2	Hapoel Jerusalem	8	4	2	2	15	9	1.667	10	
3	Homenetmen	8	3	2	3	14	15	0.933	8	
4	RAMC/CMP	8	1	2	5	11	20	0.550	4	
5	Jerusalem F.C.	8	1	2	5	9	17	0.529	4	
6	The Broons	0	-	-	-	-	-	—	0	Withdrew

Source: The Palestine Post

== National team ==
The national Eretz Israel team hosted the Lebanese national team in a friendly match, Lebanon's first official international, which was played on 27 April 1940.

27 April 1940 International Friendly	Eretz Israel	5–1	Lebanon	Tel Aviv, Mandatory Palestine
	Meitner 2'; Schneiderowitz 11'; Machlis 32'; Caspi 40', 60'	Report	Cordahi 50'	Stadium: Maccabiah Stadium; Attendance: 10,000; Referee: John Blackwell (England)

== Notable events ==
- On 9 December 1939, Maccabi Nes Tziona had beaten Maccabi Tel Aviv in a match for the Melchett Cup 2–1. In the match, held at the Maccabiah Stadium, The brothers Schneiderowitz scored the two goals for Nes Tziona on the 47th and 64th minute, while Gaul Machlis scored the only goal for Tel Aviv on the 61st minute.
