= Israel national football team results (1934–1959) =

This article provides details of international football games played by the Israel national football team from 1934 to 1959.

== Results ==
=== 1934 ===
16 March 1934 FIFA World Cup qualification	Egypt	7–1	(Mandatory Palestine) Eretz Israel	British Army Ground, Cairo
	El-Tetsh 11', 35', 51'; Taha 21', 79'; Latif 43', 87'	Report	Nudelmann 61'	Attendance: 13,000; Referee: Stanley Wells (England)

6 April 1934 FIFA World Cup qualification	Eretz Israel (Mandatory Palestine)	1–4	Egypt	Palms Ground, Tel Aviv
	Sukenik 54'	Report	Latif 2'; El-Tetsh 7', 22'; Fawzi 35'	Attendance: 8,000

=== 1938 ===
22 January 1938 FIFA World Cup qualification	Eretz Israel (Mandatory Palestine)	1–3	Greece	Maccabi Ground, Tel Aviv
	Neufeld 36'	Report	Vikelidis 15', 30'; Migiakis 73'	Attendance: 8,000

20 February 1938 FIFA World Cup qualification	Greece	1–0	(Mandatory Palestine) Eretz Israel	Stadio Leoforos Alexandras, Athens
	Vikelidis 88' (pen.)	Report		Attendance: 12,000

=== 1940 ===
27 April Friendly	Eretz Israel (Mandatory Palestine)	5–1	Lebanon	Maccabiah Stadium, Tel Aviv
	Meitner 2'; Shneiderovich 11'; Machlis 33'; Kaspi 40', 60'	Report	Cordahi 50'	Attendance: 9,000

=== 1948 ===
26 September Friendly	United States	3–1	Israel	Polo Grounds, New York City
	Sauza 14' (57); McLaughlin 44'	Report	Ben Dror 20'	Attendance: 35,000

=== 1949 ===
30 July Friendly	Israel	3–1	Cyprus	Maccabiah Stadium, Tel Aviv
	Weinberger 11', 42'; Yalovski 68'	Report	Heimonidis 36'	Attendance: 8,000

21 August 1950 FIFA World Cup qualification	Yugoslavia	6–0	Israel	JNA Stadion, Belgrade
	Pajević 12', 19', 26'; Senčar 44'; Že. Čajkovski 63'; Bobek 83' (pen.)	Report		Attendance: 35,000

18 September 1950 FIFA World Cup qualification	Israel	2–5	Yugoslavia	Maccabiah Stadium, Tel Aviv
	Glazer 65', 76'	Report	Valok 19', 64'; Bobek 20'; Zl. Čajkovski 41'; Že. Čajkovski 82'	Attendance: 20,000

=== 1950 ===
28 October Friendly	Israel	5–1	Turkey	Maccabiah Stadium, Tel Aviv
	Glazer 41', 58', 71'; Gambash 27', 88'	(Report)	64' Eken	Attendance: 20,000

3 December Friendly	Turkey	3–2	Israel	İnönü Stadium, Istanbul
	Deringör 41'; Açıksöz 64'; Küçükandonyadis 85'	(Report)	36', 39' Glazer	Attendance: 35,000

=== 1953 ===
1 November 1954 FIFA World Cup qualification	Greece	1–0	Israel	Leoforos Alexandras Stadium, Athens, Greece
	Bembis 52'	Report		Attendance: 22,00

8 November 1954 FIFA World Cup qualification	Yugoslavia	1–0	Israel	Gradski Stadion, Skopje
	Milutinović 3'	Report		Attendance: 25,000

=== 1954 ===
8 March 1954 FIFA World Cup qualification	Israel	0–2	Greece	Ramat Gan Stadium, Ramat Gan
		Report	Kokkinakis 61'; Kamaras 83'	Attendance: 35,000

21 March 1954 FIFA World Cup qualification	Israel	0–1	Yugoslavia	Ramat Gan Stadium, Ramat Gan
		Report	Zebec 80'	Attendance: 50,000

1 May Friendly	South Africa	2–1	Israel	Rand Stadium, Johannesburg
	Warren 40'; Roos 53'	Report	Glazer 42'	Attendance: 22,000

=== 1956 ===
11 July 1956 Summer Olympics qualification	Soviet Union	5–0	Israel	Dynamo Stadium, Moscow
	Tatushin 2'; Ivanov 26', 71'; Simonyan 45', 78'	Report (ru)		Attendance: 54,000; Referee: Sandy Griffiths (Wales)

31 July 1956 Summer Olympics qualification	Israel	1–2	Soviet Union	Ramat Gan Stadium, Ramat Gan
	Stelmach 64'	Report (ru)	59' Tatushin; 79' Ilyin	Attendance: 60,000

1 September 1956 AFC Asian Cup	Hong Kong	2–3	Israel	Government Stadium, Hong kong
	Au Chi Yin 12', 66'	Report	Glazer 37', 76'; Stelmach 69'	Attendance: 30,000

8 September 1956 AFC Asian Cup	Israel	1–2	South Korea	Government Stadium, Hong kong
	Stelmach 71'	Report	Woo Sang-kwon 52'; Sung Nak-woon 64'	Attendance: 25,000

12 September 1956 AFC Asian Cup	Israel	2–1	South Vietnam	Government Stadium, Hong kong
	Stelmach 14', 27'	Report	Trần Văn Tổng 58'	Attendance: 10,000

=== 1957 ===
8 October Friendly	Israel	4–5	France	Ramat Gan Stadium, Ramat Gan
	Ghougasian 22', 90'; Mordechovich 52'; Glazer 80'	Report	Vincent 11'; Gardien 26', 50'; Biancheri 70'; Glowacki 89'	Attendance: 22,000

=== 1958 ===
15 January 1958 FIFA World Cup qualification	Israel	0–2	Wales	Ramat Gan Stadium, Ramat Gan
		Report	I. Allchurch 38'; Bowen 63'	Attendance: 55,000

5 February 1958 FIFA World Cup qualification	Wales	2–0	Israel	Ninian Park, Cardiff
	I. Allchurch 76'; Jones 80'	Report		Attendance: 38,000

26 May 1958 Asian Games	Israel	4–0	Iran	Tokyo Football Stadium, Tokyo
	Glazer 21'; Stelmach 30', 78'; Reznik 67' (pen.)	Report		Attendance: 7,000

28 May 1958 Asian Games	Singapore	1–2	Israel	Korakuen Velodrome, Tokyo
	Koh 37'	Report	Nahari 5'; Stelmach 42'	Attendance: 1,500

30 May 1958 Asian Games	Republic of China	2–0	Israel	Tokyo Football Stadium, Tokyo
	32', 89'	Report		Attendance: 5,000

=== 1959 ===
21 June Friendly	Poland	7–2	Israel	Stadion Olimpijski, Wrocław
	Hachorek 23', 65'; Szarzyński 28', 62'; Liberda 32', 90'; Baszkiewicz 58'	Report	Goldstein 38'; Stelmach 62'	Attendance: 60,000

21 October 1960 Summer Olympics – Men's qualification	Israel	2–2	Yugoslavia	Ramat Gan Stadium, Ramat Gan
	Stelmach 64', 73'	Report	Kostić 7', 76'	Attendance: 40,000

29 November Friendly	Israel	1–1	Poland	Ramat Gan Stadium, Ramat Gan
	Levi 60'	Report	Pol 83'	Attendance: 50,000

5 December 1960 AFC Asian Cup qualification	Israel	0–3	Iran	Maharaja College Stadium, Kochi
		Report	Hajari 49'; Barmaki 59'; Dehdari 65'	Attendance: 30,000

8 December 1960 AFC Asian Cup qualification	India	1–3	Israel	Maharaja College Stadium, Kochi
	Kittu 60'	Report	R. Levi 35', 43', 53'	Attendance: 30,000

10 December 1960 AFC Asian Cup qualification	Israel	2–0	Pakistan	Maharaja College Stadium, Kochi
	R. Levi 55'; Stelmach 65'	Report		Attendance: 15,000

12 December 1960 AFC Asian Cup qualification	Israel	1–1	Iran	Maharaja College Stadium, Kochi
	Menchel 9'	Report	Hajari 49'	Attendance: 15,000

16 December 1960 AFC Asian Cup qualification	India	1–2	Israel	Maharaja College Stadium, Kochi
	Rahmatullah 19'	Report	Stelmach 11'; R. Levi 75'	Attendance: 35,000

17 December 1960 AFC Asian Cup qualification	Pakistan	2–2	Israel	Maharaja College Stadium, Kochi
	Umer 49'; Ghafoor 57'	Report	Menchel 60'; Ratzabi 68'	Attendance: 15,000

== See also ==
- Israel national football team results (2020–present)
- Israel national football team results (1990–2019)
- Israel national football team results (1960–1989)
