= 1940–41 in Mandatory Palestine football =

Football in Mandatory Palestine
- Season: 1940–41

The 1940–41 season was the 14th season of competitive football in the British Mandate for Palestine under the Eretz Israel Football Association.

During the season, no official competitions were held due to disagreements between Hapoel and Maccabi factions in the IFA, and the teams played only in friendly matches and tournaments.

== Non-EIFA tournaments ==
=== Melchett Cup ===
The annual cup competition for Maccabi clubs was played during September 1940. In the final, played at the Maccabiah Stadium, Maccabi Tel Aviv had beaten Maccabi Nes Tziona 2–1 with goals from Gaul Machlis and Herzl Fritzner, while Avraham Schneiderowitz scored for Nes Tziona.

=== Autumn Cup ===
This cup competition was announced by FA executive Arthur Baar as a way to have the teams playing throughout the crisis in the FA. Most Maccabi teams chose not to participate, instead competing in their own league.

The competition was played as a two-legged knockout competition. Hapoel Tel Aviv and a British military team, named after its captain, Mr. Watson, qualified for the final. The British team won the first leg, played on 18 January 1941, while Hapoel Tel Aviv won 3–1 in the return leg to win the cup.

=== National Shield ===
This league competition, also nicknamed "Ersatz League", was set up by Maccabi as a replacement for the Palestine League.

At the top, 9 teams, from the previous season's top division and Liga Bet, as well as a team representing the Sarona police force, competed for the National Shield (Hebrew: מגן הארץ, Magen HaAretz). The competition was held between November 1940 and July 1941.

The second level was divided into a Samaria (north) and Sharon (south) division, with the winners competing for a prize donated by Palestine Brewery and called Nesher Cup. Maccabi Zikhron Ya'akov won the Samaria division, Maccabi Netanya won the Sharon division, as well as being awarded the cup itself.

==== League table ====
Pos	Team	Pld	W	D	L	GF	GA	GR	Pts
1	Maccabi Petah Tikva	16	10	4	2	41	13	3.154	24
2	Maccabi Rehovot	16	10	4	2	34	14	2.429	24
3	Beitar Tel Aviv	16	10	2	4	39	22	1.773	22
4	Maccabi Tel Aviv	16	7	5	4	42	28	1.500	19
5	Sarona Police	16	9	1	6	34	24	1.417	19
6	Degel Zion Tel Aviv	16	5	4	7	21	24	0.875	14
7	Maccabi Rishon LeZion	16	5	4	7	25	29	0.862	14
8	Hakoah Tel Aviv	16	2	1	13	14	65	0.215	5
9	Maccabi Nes Tziona	16	1	1	14	11	42	0.262	3
