= 1939 Palestine Cup =

Tournament details
- Country: Mandatory Palestine

Final positions
- Champions: Hapoel Tel Aviv (5th title)
- Runners-up: Maccabi Avshalom Petah Tikva

The 1939 Palestine Cup (Hebrew: הגביע הארץ-ישראלי, HaGavia HaEretz-Israeli) was the tenth season of Israeli Football Association's nationwide football cup competition.

The defending holders, Hapoel Tel Aviv, won the cup for the third time in a row, beating Maccabi Avshalom Petah Tikva 2–1 in the Maccabiah Stadium.

== Results ==
=== First round ===
Home team	Score	Away team
Maccabi Hadera	2–5	Hapoel Tel Aviv
Maccabi Avshalom Petah Tikva	3–2	Beitar Tel Aviv
Hapoel Herzliya	5–0	Hakoah Petah Tikva
Maccabi Nes Tziona	w/o	Hapoel Rishon LeZion
British Police	w/o	HaTehiya Tel Aviv
Maccabi Tel Aviv	5–2	Degel Zion Tel Aviv
Hakoah Tel Aviv	3–2 (a.e.t.)	Hegge Tel Aviv

=== Quarter-finals ===
Home team	Score	Away team
Maccabi Tel Aviv	3–2	British Police
Hapoel Rishon LeZion	1–3	Maccabi Avshalom Petah Tikva
Hakoah Tel Aviv	0–0 (a.e.t.)	Hapoel Herzliya

Bye: Hapoel Tel Aviv

==== Replay ====
Home team	Score	Away team
Hapoel Herzliya	1–6	Hakoah Tel Aviv

=== Semi-finals ===
Home team	Score	Away team
Hapoel Tel Aviv	4–1	Hakoah Tel Aviv
Maccabi Avshalom Petah Tikva	1–0	Maccabi Tel Aviv

=== Final ===
6 May 1939

Hapoel Tel Aviv	2–1	Maccabi Avshalom Petah Tikva
Fuchs 14'; Meitner 15'		Zimmett 12'

Maccabiah Stadium, Tel Aviv
Attendance: 3000
Referee: Marcus
