= 1940 Palestine Cup =

Tournament details
- Country: Mandatory Palestine

Final positions
- Champions: Beitar Tel Aviv
- Runners-up: Maccabi Tel Aviv

The 1940 Palestine Cup (Hebrew: הגביע הארץ-ישראלי, HaGavia HaEretz-Israeli) was the eleventh season of Israeli Football Association's nationwide football cup competition.

The defending holders, Hapoel Tel Aviv, fell to city rival Maccabi Tel Aviv at the semi-final. Maccabi met the emerging team of Beitar Tel Aviv at the final and lost 1–3.

== Results ==
=== First round ===
Draw for the round was held in early January 1940. The 6 teams from the Tel Aviv division of the 1939 Palestine League were given a bye to the second round, along with Hapoel Haifa. Hapoel Ramat Gan also received a bye during the draw.

| Home team | Score | Away team |
|---|---|---|
| 17th Heavy Battery | 2–1 (a.e.t.) annulled (Note: As this match was played for 80 minutes (regular time) and 20 minutes of extra time, the EIFA annulled the result and ordered a replay.) | RAOC Haifa |
| Hapoel Ra'anana | 1–2 | RAF Ramla |
| Hapoel Rishon LeZion | 0–1 | Maccabi-Hakoah Petah Tikva |
| Maccabi Rehovot | 3–3 (a.e.t.) | Degel Zion Tel Aviv |
| Beitar Tel Aviv | 7–0 | Maccabi Rishon LeZion |
| Maccabi Hadera | 1–5 | RSG Rehovot |
| Hapoel Petah Tikva | 3–1 | Hapoel Hadera |
| Hegge Tel Aviv | 1–4 | Egged Tel Aviv |

==== Replay ====
| Home team | Score | Away team |
|---|---|---|
| 17th Heavy Battery | 5–3 | RAOC Haifa |
| Degel Zion Tel Aviv | 2–1 (a.e.t.) | Maccabi Rehovot |

=== Second round ===
| Home team | Score | Away team |
|---|---|---|
| Beitar Tel Aviv | 4–1 | RSG Rehovot |
| RAF Ramla | 2–3 | Hapoel Haifa |
| Hakoah Tel Aviv | 0–5 | Maccabi Tel Aviv |
| 17th Heavy Battery | 2–1 | Maccabi Avshalom Petah Tikva |
| Hapoel Tel Aviv | 5–1 | Maccabi-Hakoah Petah Tikva |
| Hapoel Ramat Gan | 1–4 | Egged Tel Aviv |
| Maccabi Nes Tziona | 1–3 | Degel Zion Tel Aviv |
| Hapoel Petah Tikva | w/o | Hapoel Herzliya |

=== Quarter-finals ===
| Home team | Score | Away team |
|---|---|---|
| Egged Tel Aviv | 3–6 | 17th Heavy Battery |
| Hapoel Petah Tikva | 0–3 | Hapoel Tel Aviv |
| Maccabi Tel Aviv | 5–1 | Degel Zion Tel Aviv |
| Beitar Tel Aviv | 3–0 | Hapoel Haifa |

=== Semi-finals ===
| Home team | Score | Away team |
|---|---|---|
| Maccabi Tel Aviv | 4–0 | Hapoel Tel Aviv |
| Beitar Tel Aviv | 1–0 (a.e.t.) | 17th Heavy Battery |

=== Final ===
18 May 1940

| Maccabi Tel Aviv | 1–3 | Beitar Tel Aviv |
|---|---|---|
| Beit HaLevi 9' | | Kretchman 6'; Bogdanov 60'; Panz 88' |

Maccabiah Stadium, Tel Aviv
Attendance: 8000
Referee: Chodshoni
