= Herzl Fritzner =

Israeli footballer and manager

Herzl Fritzner הרצל פריצנר
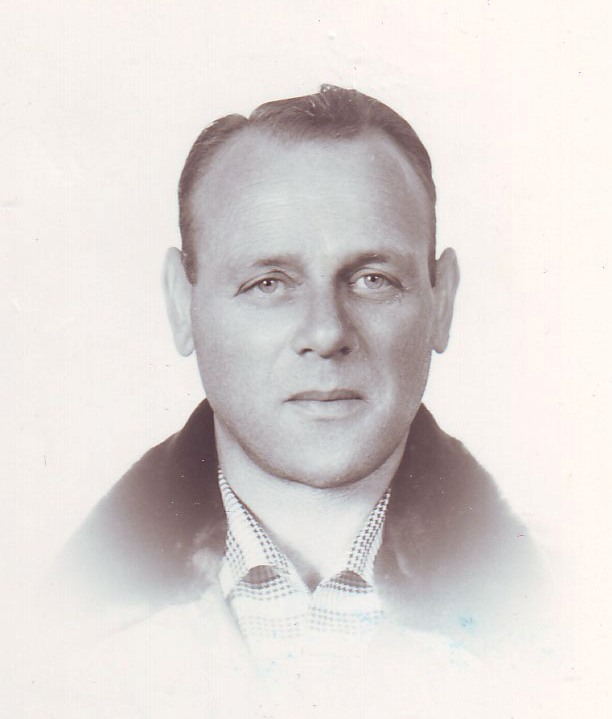
- Herzl Fritzner

Personal information
- Full name: Herzl Heinz Fritzner
- Date of birth: 21 November 1919
- Place of birth: Kiev, Ukraine
- Date of death: 16 March 2007 (aged 87)
- Place of death: Israel
- Position: Forward

Youth career
- 1932–1934: Maccabi Düsseldorf

Senior career*
Years	Team	Apps	(Gls)
1934–35	Hermes DVS		
1939–1940	Maccabi Rehovot		
1940–41	Sarona Police		
1941–1946	Maccabi Tel Aviv		
1946–1947	Hapoel Ramat Gan		
1947–1953	Hapoel Tel Aviv		
1953–1959	Hapoel Ramat Gan		

Managerial career
- 1959: Maccabi Ramat Amidar
- 1960–61: Hapoel Ramat Gan
- * Club domestic league appearances and goals

Herzl Fritzner (Hebrew: הרצל פריצנר) was an Israeli footballer and manager, who played for Maccabi Rehovot, Maccabi Tel Aviv, Hapoel Tel Aviv and Hapoel Ramat Gan and coached Maccabi Ramat Amidar and Hapoel Ramat Gan.

== Biography ==
Fritzner was born in Kiev in 1919 and moved with his family to the Netherlands when he was 5. As a teenager, Fritzner was sent to a boarding school in Düsseldorf, where he played for the local Maccabi club. In 1935, Fritzner immigrated to Palestine on his own, with the Youth Aliyah organization and settled at Kibbutz Na'an. While at the Kibbutz, Fritzner represented the local Hapoel club in athletics, with his main event being the shot put, in which he set a Hapoel junior record of 11.39 m in 1937.

In 1938, Fritzner moved to Rehovot, where he worked in the Jewish Settlement Police and joined the local Maccabi club. While continuing to compete in Athletics, excelling in shot put and javelin throw, Fritzner started playing football with Maccabi Rehovot in Liga Bet. As a member of the settlement police, Fritzner was drafted into the regional police football team, Sarona Police, which competed and won the Settlement Police Cup. The police team also competed, along with other Maccabi clubs, in the Maccabi Ersatz League, and as the police team was disbanded, Fritzner joined Maccabi Tel Aviv.

Fritzner stayed at Maccabi Tel Aviv until 1946, winning one championship and two cups, scoring a goal in the 1941 Palestine Cup final. In 1946, Fritzner moved to Hapoel Ramat Gan for one season, after which he transferred to Hapoel Tel Aviv, where he stayed until 1953. Fritzner played until his retirement with Hapoel Ramat Gan, while also coaching Ramat Gan club Maccabi Ramat Amidar. During the 1959–60 season, Fritzner was appointed as head coach for Hapoel Ramat Gan, but didn't manage to save the club from relegation. Fritzner stayed with the club in its first season in Liga Alef, after which he was replaced by Moshe Varon and retired from football altogether.

== Honours ==
- League Championships (1):
  - 1939–40
- Cup (2):
  - 1941, 1946
