= 1941 Palestine Cup =

Tournament details
- Country: Mandatory Palestine

Final positions
- Champions: Maccabi Tel Aviv (4th title)
- Runners-up: Hapoel Tel Aviv

The 1941 Palestine Cup (Hebrew: הגביע הארץ-ישראלי, HaGavia HaEretz-Israeli) was the twelfth season of Israeli Football Association's nationwide football cup competition. The defending holders were Beitar Tel Aviv.

The competition was delayed by disagreements within the EIFA, and instead of its usual start in early 1941 and finish at the end of the 1940–41 season, matches started on 20 September 1941, at the start of the 1941–42 season.

This competition saw a rise in the number of British and Arab teams, in part due to the heavy military presence in Palestine during the war. Among these teams were some ad hoc teams, assembled for the competition and named after the chairmen or captain. Despite this, and for the fourth time since the competition started, the two top Tel Aviv teams, Maccabi and Hapoel met in the final. Maccabi won 2–1 to earn its 4th cup.

== Results ==
=== First round ===
Home team	Score	Away team
RAMC XI	2–1	Maccabi Jerusalem
Donaldson's XI	2–5	Maccabi Avshalom Petah Tikva
Beitar Netanya	2–4	Imperial Haifa
Hapoel Hadera	1–4	RAF XI
Hapoel Jerusalem	1–3	Degel Zion Tel Aviv
Homenetmen Jerusalem	1–0	Hapoel Petah Tikva
Maccabi Rishon LeZion	1–3	Hapoel Rishon LeZion
Hakoah Tel Aviv	0–3	Hapoel Rehovot
RAPC XI	w/o	Brown's XI
Hapoel Ramat Gan	3–4	Maccabi Netanya
Mander's XI	1–0	Hapoel Netanya

=== Second round ===
Home team	Score	Away team
Maccabi Avshalom Petah Tikva	1–2 (a.e.t.) (Note: The first match was terminated at half time, when the Recruiting Committee of Petah Tikva demanded that players of both teams who were of military age should not be allowed to play. The Score at the time of abandonment was 1 – 0 to Maccabi Avshalom Petah Tikva. The tie was rearranged for the following week.)	Hapoel Tel Aviv
Hapoel Rishon LeZion	2–1	Imperial Haifa
Homenetmen Jerusalem	1–4	Beitar Tel Aviv
Hapoel Rehovot	2–1	RAMC XI
RAF XI	2–1	Maccabi Netanya
Brown's XI	2–3	Degel Zion Tel Aviv
Maccabi Nes Tziona	1–2	Mander's XI
Hapoel Haifa	2–4	Maccabi Tel Aviv

=== Quarter-finals ===
Home team	Score	Away team
Beitar Tel Aviv	2–4 (a.e.t.)	Hapoel Tel Aviv
RAF XI	w/o (Note: Due to military duty, the RAF could field only 8 men, and Maccabi was given a walkover win.)	Maccabi Tel Aviv
Hapoel Rehovot	1–4	Hapoel Rishon LeZion
Mander's Army XI	0–2	Degel Zion Tel Aviv

=== Semi-finals ===
Home team	Score	Away team
Hapoel Rishon LeZion	0–4 (Note: Abandoned at the 60th minute as a Hapoel Rishon LeZion player was sent off, but refused to leave the pitch.)	Maccabi Tel Aviv
Hapoel Tel Aviv	2–0	Degel Zion Tel Aviv

=== Final ===
15 November 1941

Maccabi Tel Aviv	2–1	Hapoel Tel Aviv
Fritzner 53'; A. Sidi 87'	Report	Philosof 43'

Maccabiah Stadium, Tel Aviv
Attendance: 10,000
Referee: Markus
