= 1946 Palestine Cup =

Tournament details
- Country: Mandatory Palestine

Final positions
- Champions: Maccabi Tel Aviv (5th title)
- Runners-up: Hapoel Rishon LeZion

The 1946 Palestine Cup (Hebrew: הגביע הארץ-ישראלי, HaGavia HaEretz-Israeli) was the fourteenth season of Israeli Football Association's nationwide football cup competition.

The defending champion, Beitar Tel Aviv was eliminated in the first round after losing twice to Maccabi Nes Tziona. Hapoel Tel Aviv had difficulties throughout the competition, losing a match in the first round to minnows Hapoel Givatayim, and barely making it through the next round against Maccabi Rehovot, finally crashing to Hapoel Rishon LeZion in the quarter-finals.

Maccabi Tel Aviv and Hapoel Rishon LeZion met in the two-legged final, Maccabi winning both legs to obtain its 5th cup.

== Format ==
For this season, each round was played over two legs, based on the Mitropa Cup. The change in format was caused by disagreements between Hapoel and Maccabi factions within the EIFA, which prevented any EIFA activities until March 1946. As the disagreement was settled in March, the EIFA decided to expand the cup competitions to two matches per round, to allow the teams more matches to play.

== Results ==
=== First round ===
| Team 1 | Agg. | Team 2 | 1st leg | 2nd leg |
|---|---|---|---|---|
| Hapoel Tel Aviv | 6–1 | Hapoel Givatayim | 6–0 | 0–1 |
| Maccabi Tel Aviv | 6–0 | Hapoel Rehovot | 3–0 | 3–0 (f) |
| Degel Zion Tel Aviv | 1–13 | Hapoel Haifa | 1–10 | 0–3 (f) |
| Maccabi Nes Tziona | 4–2 | Beitar Tel Aviv | 3–2 | 1–0 |
| Maccabi Rishon LeZion | 3–4 | Maccabi Rehovot | 2–2 | 1–2 |
| Maccabi Avshalom Petah Tikva | 5–2 | Hapoel Dror Haifa | 3–1 | 2–1 |
| Maccabi Netanya | 10–1 | Maccabi Haifa | 5–0 | 5–1 |
| Hapoel Balfouria | 3–3 | Beitar Petah Tikva | 0–3 (Note: The match was abandoned at the 65th minute due to the ball bursting. Beitar Petah Tikva was awarded a 0–3 victory.) | 3–0 (Note: Hapoel Balfouria won 2–0 originally, but was awarded a 3–0 win since Beitar Petah Tikva fielded ineligible players.) |
| Hapoel Hadera | 1–3 | Hapoel HaTzafon Tel Aviv | 0–3 (Note: Hapoel Hadera originally won 3–0. The EIFA awarded the match to Hapoel HaTzafon Tel Aviv, as Hapoel Hadera appeared to the match without its players' EIFA member cards.) | 1–0 |
| Beitar Jerusalem | w/o | Hakoah Tel Aviv | – | – |
| Maccabi Ramat Gan | 4–2 | Beitar Netanya | 1–0 | 3–2 |
| Hapoel Herzliya | w/o | Hapoel Rishon LeZion | – | – |
| Hapoel Petah Tikva | 10–3 | Hapoel Ramat Gan | 6–1 | 4–2 |
| Hapoel Jerusalem | 5–4 | Maccabi HaTzafon Tel Aviv | 3–3 | 2–1 |
| Bnei Yehuda | 2–5 | Hapoel Netanya | 2–2 | 0–3 (f) |
| Hakoah 09 Tel Aviv | 6–3 | Beitar Ramat Gan | 4–1 (Note: The match was abandoned at the 60th minute due to unruly behavior of Beitar Ramat Gan players and the result stood.) | 2–2 |

==== Deciding match ====
| Home team | Score | Away team |
|---|---|---|
| Hapoel Balfouria | w/o | Beitar Petah Tikva |

=== Second round ===
| Team 1 | Agg. | Team 2 | 1st leg | 2nd leg |
|---|---|---|---|---|
| Hapoel HaZafon Tel Aviv | 3–3 | Hapoel Rishon LeZion | 1–1 | 2–2 |
| Maccabi Tel Aviv | 6–5 | Beitar Jerusalem | 3–2 | 3–3 |
| Hapoel Haifa | 5–4 | Maccabi Netanya | 4–2 | 1–2 |
| Hapoel Netanya | 0–5 | Maccabi Nes Tziona | 0–0 | 0–5 |
| Maccabi Rehovot | 3–3 | Hapoel Tel Aviv | 2–2 | 1–1 |
| Maccabi Ramat Gan | 4–3 | Hakoah 09 Tel Aviv | 1–1 | 3–2 |
| Maccabi Avshalom Petah Tikva | 1–4 | Hapoel Petah Tikva | 0–2 | 1–2 |
| Hapoel Jerusalem | 4–0 | Hapoel Balfouria | 2–0 | 2–0 |

==== Deciding matches ====
| Home team | Score | Away team |
|---|---|---|
| Hapoel HaZafon Tel Aviv | 0–1 | Hapoel Rishon LeZion |
| Hapoel Tel Aviv | 4–2 | Maccabi Rehovot |

=== Quarter-finals ===
| Team 1 | Agg. | Team 2 | 1st leg | 2nd leg |
|---|---|---|---|---|
| Hapoel Haifa | 2–9 | Maccabi Tel Aviv | 1–3 | 1–6 |
| Hapoel Petah Tikva | 0–5 | Maccabi Nes Tziona | 0–3 | 0–2 |
| Hapoel Rishon LeZion | 2–0 | Hapoel Tel Aviv | 1–0 | 1–0 |
| Hapoel Jerusalem | 6–1 | Maccabi Ramat Gan | 6–0 | 0–1 |

=== Semi-finals ===
| Team 1 | Agg. | Team 2 | 1st leg | 2nd leg |
|---|---|---|---|---|
| Maccabi Nes Tziona | 2–9 | Maccabi Tel Aviv | 0–3 | 2–6 |
| Hapoel Jerusalem | 2–3 | Hapoel Rishon LeZion | 0–1 | 2–2 |

=== Finals ===
==== First leg ====
22 June 1946

| Maccabi Tel Aviv | 3–1 | Hapoel Rishon LeZion |
|---|---|---|
| Eli Fuchs 25'; Yosef Merimovich 28'; Sidi 75' | | Shatov 50' |

Maccabiah Stadium, Tel Aviv
Attendance: 4,000
Referee: Klein

==== Second leg ====
14 July 1946

| Maccabi Tel Aviv | 3–0 | Hapoel Rishon LeZion |
|---|---|---|
| Kashi 7'; Yosef Merimovich 51'; Gurfinkel 79' |

Maccabiah Stadium, Tel Aviv
Attendance: 4,000
Referee: Yon

Maccabi Tel Aviv won 6–2 on aggregate.
