= Substitute (association football) =

Type of player in association football

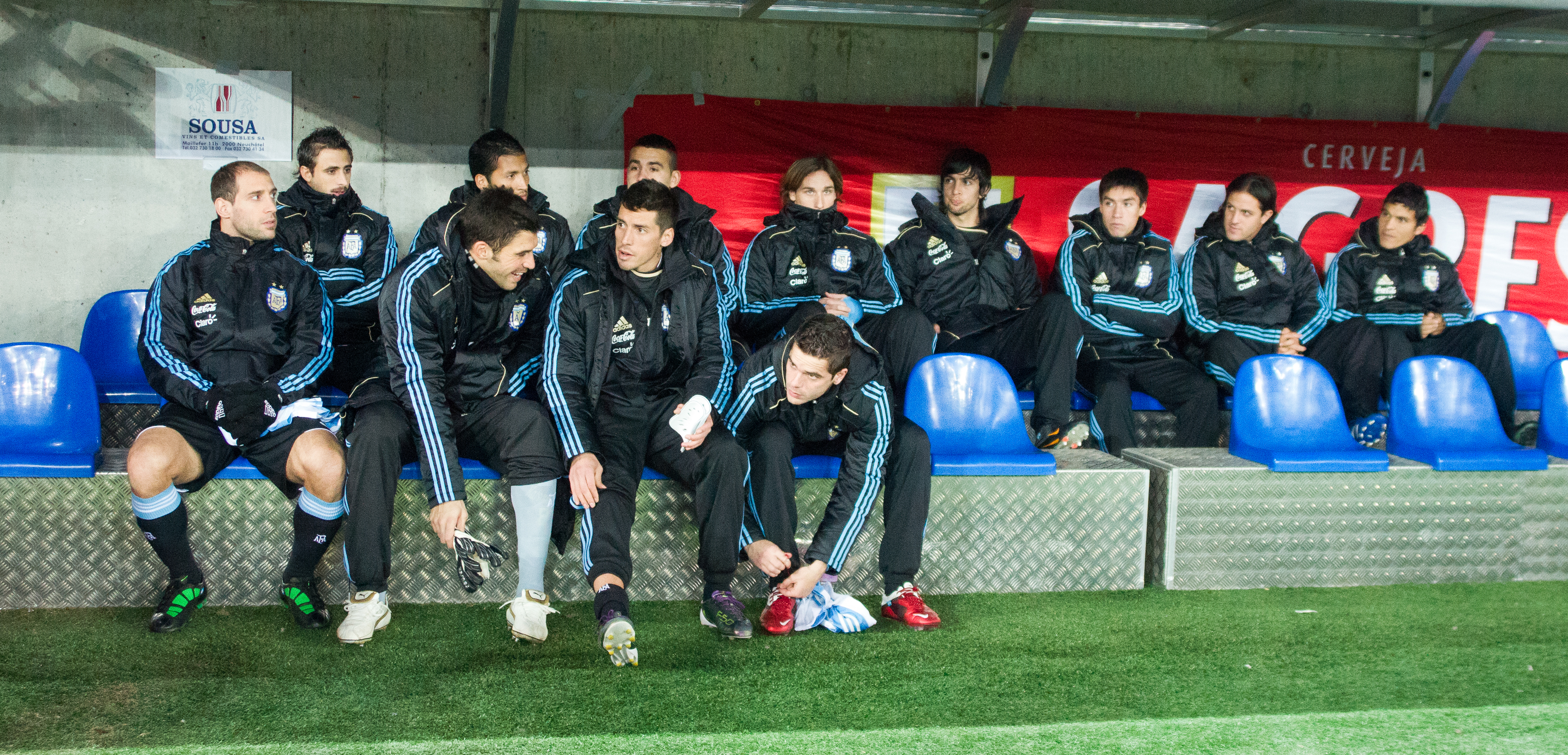
The substitute bench of the Argentina national team.

In association football, a substitute is a player who is brought on to the pitch during a match in exchange for an existing player who may be tired, injured, or performing poorly. There are also tactical reasons (such as bringing a striker on in place of a defender). A player who has been substituted during a match takes no further part in the game.

Substitutions were officially added to the Laws of the Game in 1958. Prior to this most games were played with no changes permitted at all, with occasional exceptions in cases of extreme injury or players not arriving to matches on time.

The number of substitutes has risen over time as well as the number of reserve players allowed to be nominated. It is now common for games to allow a maximum of five substitutions; some competitions allow for an additional substitution when playing extra time. A maximum of three "substitution opportunities" are provided to a side during normal time, and an extra opportunity during extra time. Substitutions can be made during half-time breaks during normal and extra time, and full time breaks (before the start of extra time), but do not count as substitution opportunities. There is also a provision of an additional substitution beyond whatever limits the match is being played under to be used specifically for a player who has sustained a concussion.

Teams choose a substitute player from a pre-selected set of reserve players, these players typically sit in the technical area with the coaches, and are said to be "on the bench". When the substitute enters the field of play it is said they have come on or have been brought on, while the player they are substituting for is coming off, or being brought off or substituted. This pool of reserve players has also steadily increased in most competitions where they now allow 5, 7 or 9 reserves while in international competitive tournaments it is common that every player selected in the tournament squad (usually 23 players total) is an eligible substitute if they aren't suspended from the game.

A player who is noted for frequently making appearances, or scoring important goals, as a substitute is often informally known as a "super sub".

== History ==
The origin of football substitutes goes back to at least the early 1860s as part of English public school football games. The original use of the term substitute in football was to describe the replacement of players who failed to turn up for matches. For example, in 1863, a match report states: "The Charterhouse eleven played a match in cloisters against some old Carthusians but in consequence of the non-appearance of some of those who were expected it was necessary to provide three substitutes." The substitution of absent players happened as early as the 1850s, for example from Eton College where the term emergencies is used. Numerous references to players acting as a "substitute" occur in matches in the mid-1860s where it is not indicated whether these were replacements of absent players or of players injured during the match.

The International Football Association Board first added Substitution to the Laws of the Game in 1958, although there are recorded instances of substitution being permitted on earlier occasions. A friendly in Glasgow between Lancelot and Crosshill in November 1875 saw a Lancelot player injured and Crosshill "allow[ed] them to put a fresh man in his place". The earliest known use of a substitute in a competitive match came on 7 November 1885, when the Lockwood Brothers club used a substitute in an FA Cup first round replay against Notts Rangers, after midfielder F. Brears suffered a broken leg.

The first use of a substitute in international football was on 15 April 1889, in the match between Wales and Scotland in Wrexham. Wales's original goalkeeper, Jim Trainer, failed to arrive; local amateur player Alf Pugh started the match and played for some 20 minutes until the arrival of Sam Gillam, who took over from him. In 1940, in a match between Mandatory Palestine and Lebanon, Mandatory Palestine centre-half Zvi Fuchs was replaced at half-time by Lonia Dvorin following an injury. Also during the qualifying phase for the 1954 World Cup, Horst Eckel of Germany is recorded as having been replaced by Richard Gottinger in their match with the Saarland on 11 October 1953. The use of substitutes in World Cup matches was not allowed until the 1970 tournament.

The number of substitutes usable in a competitive match has increased from zero, meaning that teams were reduced if players' injuries could not allow them to play on, to one in 1958; to two out of a possible five in 1988. With the later increases in substitutions allowed, the number of potential substitute players increased to seven. The number of substitutes increased to two plus one (injured goalkeeper) in 1994, to three in 1995, and to a fourth substitute in certain competitions (starting from UEFA Euro 2016) in extra time. In 2020, following a proposal from FIFA, the International Football Association Board allowed for competition organisers to temporarily allow for a maximum of five substitutions (with an additional allowed in extra time, where applicable) to be made in official matches for the remainder of the year in order to lessen the impact of fixture congestion caused by the COVID-19 pandemic. However, there will only be three opportunities to make substitutions (with an additional allowed in extra time, where applicable). This change was made permanent in 2022.

== Procedure ==
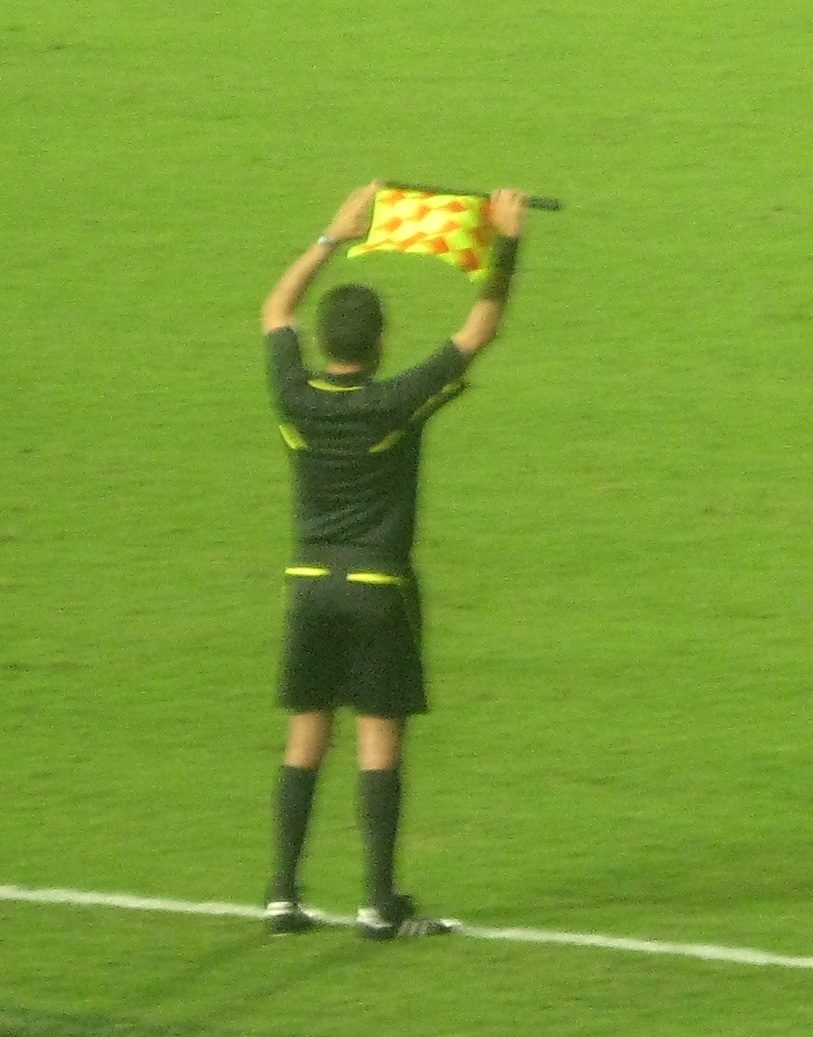
The assistant referee indicating a substitution

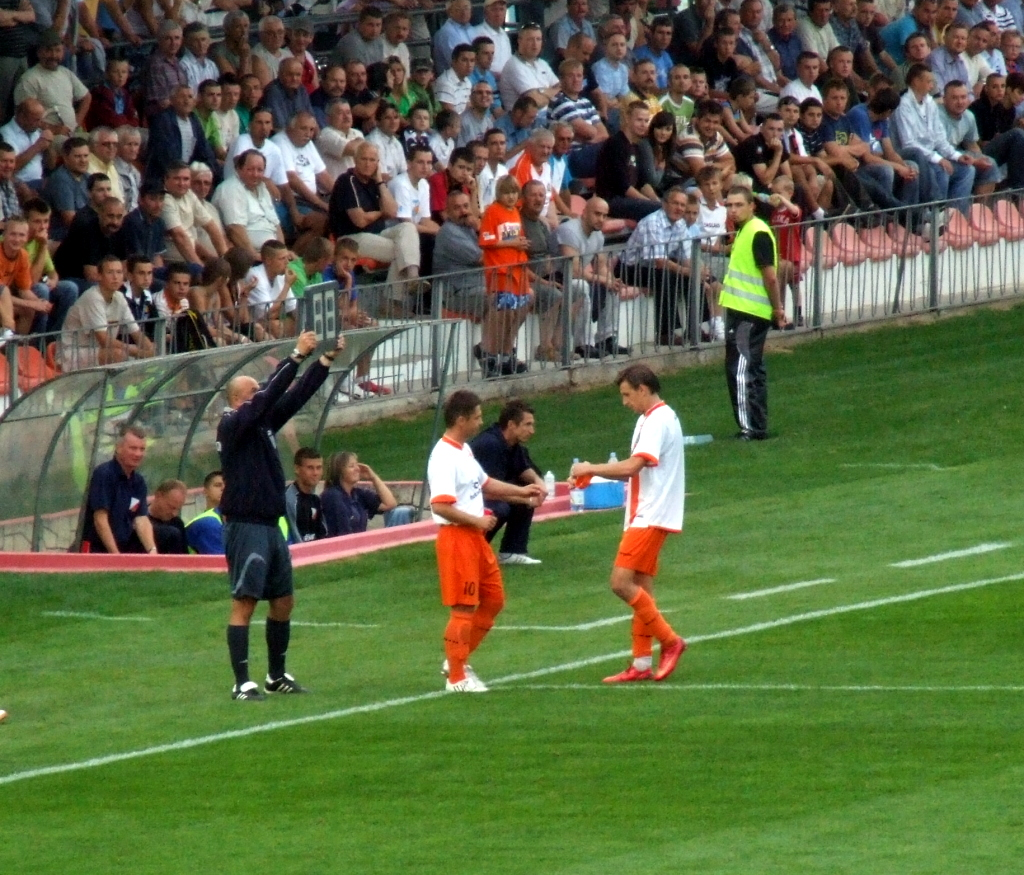
Fourth official notifying the referee of the details of the substitution

Substitutions are governed under Law 3 of the Laws of the Game in the (3) Substitution Procedure section.

A player can be substituted only during a stoppage in play and with the permission of the referee. The player to be substituted (outgoing player) must have left the field of play within 10 seconds of the substitution board being shown or, where there is no board, of the referee’s signal for the substitution to take place before the substitute (incoming player) may enter the field of play; at that point the substitute becomes an active player and the person substituted ceases to be an active player. The incoming player may enter the field only at the halfway line. Failure to comply with these provisions may be punished by a caution (yellow card).

A player who has been substituted takes no further part in a match.

Unused substitutes still on the bench, as well as players who have been already substituted, remain under the authority of the referee. These are liable for misconduct, though cannot be said to have committed a foul. For example, in the 2002 FIFA World Cup, Claudio Caniggia was shown the red card for cursing at the referee from the bench.

Under the Laws of the Game, the referee has no specific power to force a player to be substituted, even if the team manager or captain has ordered their player to be substituted. As Law 3 (3) Substitution Procedure simply states that: "if a player who is to be replaced refuses to leave, play continues."

A player who has been sent off (red card) cannot be replaced; the team will have to continue with one fewer player. In the case of a goalkeeper who is sent off, the coach will usually (but is not required to) substitute an outfield player so that the backup goalkeeper can enter the game. For example, in the 2006 UEFA Champions League Final, Arsenal midfielder Robert Pires was replaced by second-choice goalkeeper Manuel Almunia to replace Jens Lehmann, who was sent off less than 20 minutes into the match. If all substitutions have been used, or if no goalkeeper is available, an outfield player must take up the role of the goalkeeper. A famous example of this is when Chelsea goalkeepers Petr Čech and Carlo Cudicini were both injured in a 2006 game against Reading led to defender John Terry spending the remainder of the match in goal wearing third-choice goalkeeper Hilário's shirt.

According to the Laws of the Game, "the number of substitutes, up to a maximum of five, which may be used in any match played in an official competition will be determined by FIFA, the confederation or the national football association."

Also:

- In national A team matches, up to a maximum of six substitutes may be used.
- In all other matches, a greater number of substitutes may be used provided that:
  - the teams concerned reach agreement on a maximum number;
  - the referee is informed before the match.
- If the referee is not informed, or if no agreement is reached before the match, no more than six substitutes are allowed.

For lower non-leagues, amateur leagues and social leagues sanctioned by private football organisers in many countries, unlimited substitutions are allowed in each game.

=== Substitution opportunities ===
Following the introduction of five substitutions in matches, "substitution opportunities" were established to avoid time-wasting and disruption to the game. Each team is given only three windows (opportunities) during a match to make their five substitutions. For competitions allowing an additional substitution in extra time, each team will have one additional substitution opportunity (any unused substitution opportunities from regular time will carry over to extra time). Substitutions made at half-time, before the start of extra time, and at half-time in extra time do not count towards a team's substitution opportunities. When both teams make a substitution simultaneously, it counts as a used substitution opportunity for both teams. Multiple substitutions (and requests) made by a team during the same stoppage in play count as one used substitution opportunity.

== Concussion substitute ==
In October 2019, the International Football Association Board (IFAB) began discussing the use of additional substitutions for players who are suspected to have sustained a concussion during a match. Earlier in the year, the chairman of FIFA's medical committee, Michel D'Hooghe, said the body was open to discussing concussion substitutions. UEFA had also called for FIFA and IFAB to allow for temporary substitutes for suspected head injuries. The idea had been previously discussed by the FIFA Executive Committee five years earlier. However, the prevailing view was that the rule would hurt football's "universality", as it would be difficult to replicate on a grassroots level, and could be exploited to waste time and/or gain an additional substitution.

In 2014, UEFA introduced a rule to allow referees to stop matches for up to three minutes to assess head injuries, with players only allowed to return after the team doctor could confirm the player's fitness to carry on. The three-minute rule was similarly adopted at the 2018 FIFA World Cup. The change came following high-profile head injuries at the 2014 FIFA World Cup, and calls by FIFPro for FIFA to review its concussion protocol.

Initially, IFAB had considered a ten-minute assessment period for players suspected of a concussion, with a substitute replacing them in the interim. In December 2019, IFAB agreed to appoint an expert group, composed of sports medical specialists and football experts, to identify options for the assessment and management of suspected concussions during matches. Following feedback from the Concussion Expert Group, IFAB announced in February 2020 that it would draw up concussion substitute protocols to be used in trials. In October 2020, the expert group announced that an "additional permanent substitution" protocol would be used to protect the health of players using an "if in doubt, take them out" philosophy, and that trials would start in 2021. The protocol and trial was formally approved by IFAB on 16 December 2020. Under the protocol, players suspected of a concussion will be permanently removed from the match and replaced by a substitute. This prevents a player from sustaining multiple head injuries in a match, prevents teams from suffering a numerical or tactical disadvantage, reduces the pressure on medical personnel to make a quick assessment and can be applied on all levels of the game. Competition organisers must be approved by FIFA and IFAB to participate in the trial period, which will last from January 2021 to March 2022.

In January 2021, FIFA announced that it would trial concussion substitutes in the following month at the 2020 FIFA Club World Cup. Later that month, it was announced that the Premier League, FA Women's Super League, FA Women's Championship and FA Cup would begin the trial in February 2021. On 9 February 2021, West Ham United made the first concussion substitution in English football during an FA Cup match against Manchester United, when Issa Diop was replaced by Ryan Fredericks at half-time following a head injury. The trial is also taking place in the Eredivisie, Eerste Divisie and KNVB Cup.

=== Trial protocol ===
IFAB announced two protocols for concussion substitutes, with competition organisers able to choose which to use. The use of concussion substitutes will operate in conjunction with other protocols used, including the three-minute break for an on-field concussion assessment.

Both protocols use the following general principles and procedures:

- A concussion substitution does not count towards the number of substitutions allowed in a match;
- In competitions where the number of named substitutes is the same as the maximum number of substitutes allowed, the concussion substitute can be a player who has previously been substituted out of the match.
- A concussion substitution may be made:
  - Immediately after a concussion occurs or is suspected;
  - After an initial three-minute on-field assessment, and/or after an off-field assessment;
  - At any other time when a concussion occurs or is suspected (including when a player has previously been assessed and has returned to the field of play).
- If a team decides to make a concussion substitution, the match officials must be informed (ideally by using a substitution card/form of a different colour).
- The injured player is not permitted to take any further part in the match, including a penalty shoot-out.

The following principles are specific to each protocol:

- Protocol A
  - Each team is permitted to use a maximum of one concussion substitute during a match.
  - When a concussion substitute is used, no change will be made to the maximum number of substitutions permitted by the opposing team.
- Protocol B
  - Each team is permitted to use a maximum of two concussion substitutes during a match.
  - When a concussion substitute is used, the opposing team has the option of using an additional substitute for any reason.
    - The opposing team is informed of their additional substitution opportunity by the match officials.
    - The additional substitution may be used concurrently with the concussion substitution or at any time thereafter.

== Super-sub ==
The term "super-sub" refers to a player who is not a regular in the starting line-up but who is noted for often coming on as a substitute and making a significant impact on the game. Players regarded as "super-subs" include Semih Şentürk for Fenerbahçe, David Fairclough and Divock Origi for Liverpool, John Hewitt for Aberdeen, Tosaint Ricketts for Vancouver Whitecaps, Adam Le Fondre for Reading, Ole Gunnar Solskjær, Javier Hernández and Scott McTominay for Manchester United, Mikael Forssell for Chelsea, Edin Džeko for Manchester City, Giovanni Simeone for Napoli, Brendon Santalab for Western Sydney Wanderers, Henrique for Brisbane Roar, Stevie Kirk for Motherwell, Archie Thompson, Joshua Kennedy and Tim Cahill for Australia, Fernando Llorente for Tottenham Hotspur, Roger Milla for Cameroon, Oliver Bierhoff for Germany, Mohamed "Gedo" Nagy for the Egypt national team during the 2010 Africa Cup of Nations, Ilsinho for Philadelphia Union, and Abby Wambach and Carli Lloyd for the United States women's team.
