= 1944–45 Palestine League =

Palestine League
- Season: 1944–45
- Champions: Hapoel Tel Aviv; Beitar Tel Aviv

The 1944-45 Palestine League was a special edition of the Palestine League, designated as a "test league". For this season, 14 teams took part in the league, divided into two regional leagues. The northern division was won by Hapoel Tel Aviv, while the southern district was won by Beitar Tel Aviv.

The two regional winners were due to meet at the end of the season in two friendly matches, however these matches were not played, and currently the IFA recognize both team as league champions for this season.

== League tables ==
=== Northern Division ===
Pos	Team	Pld	W	D	L	GF	GA	GD	Pts	
1	Hapoel Tel Aviv	10	8	2	0	28	8	+20	18	Joint champions
2	Hapoel Ramat Gan	10	5	3	2	29	16	+13	13	
3	Hapoel Haifa	12	5	3	4	24	19	+5	13	
4	Maccabi Tel Aviv	11	4	3	4	19	16	+3	11	
5	Hapoel Petah Tikva	11	4	2	5	14	13	+1	10	
6	Maccabi Petah Tikva	12	3	1	8	9	32	−23	7	
7	Maccabi Netanya	12	3	0	9	21	40	−19	6	
8	Hapoel Herzliya	0	–	–	–	–	–	—	0	

=== Southern Division ===
Pos	Team	Pld	W	D	L	GF	GA	GD	Pts	
1	Beitar Tel Aviv	10	9	1	0	33	9	+24	19	Joint champions
2	Maccabi Rehovot	10	6	1	3	22	11	+11	13	
3	Maccabi Rishon LeZion	12	5	2	5	23	21	+2	12	
4	Maccabi Nes Tziona	11	5	1	5	16	18	−2	11	
5	Hapoel Rehovot	11	5	0	6	29	26	+3	10	
6	Hapoel Rishon LeZion	10	4	1	5	16	19	−3	9	
7	Hakoah Tel Aviv	10	0	0	10	5	40	−35	0	
