= 1922–23 Maccabi Petah Tikva F.C. season =

Maccabi Petah Tikva
1922–23 season

The 1922–23 season was Maccabi Petah Tikva's 10th season since its establishment in 1913. As the local football association wasn't founded until July 1928, there were no officially organized competitions during the season, and the club played only friendly matches.

== Overview ==
At the beginning of the season, the club was re-organized and was named after Avshalom Gissin, a former member of the club, who had been killed during the 1921 riots. During the season, the club took part in a cup competition which was called "The Hebrew Cup", and was eliminated in the quarter finals by Maccabi NesTziona. The club also took part in a league competition with other 7 clubs which was called Mis'chaki HaBechora (Hebrew: משחקי הבכורה, lit. The Premier Games), The league was completed during the following season.

== Known Matches ==
=== The Hebrew Cup ===
Date	Opponent	Venue	Result	Scorers
	Maccabi Nes Tziona		0–3	

=== Mis'chakei HaBechora ===
==== Table (as of 21 July 1923) ====
Pos	Team	Pld	W	D	L	GF	GA	GR	Pts
1	Maccabi Petah Tikva	3	3	0	0	7	1	7.000	6
2	Maccabi Nes Tziona	4	3	0	1	11	8	1.375	6
3	Maccabi Petah Tikva	4	2	1	1	12	3	4.000	5
4	Nordia Rishon LeZion	5	1	3	1	7	5	1.400	5
5	Hakoah Tel Aviv	3	1	1	1	5	3	1.667	3
6	Ayala	2	1	0	1	5	5	1.000	2
7	Ofer	4	0	1	3	1	14	0.071	1
8	Rehovot	3	0	0	3	1	10	0.100	0

Updated to match(es) played on 21 July 1923. Source: Do'ar HaYom

==== Matches ====
Date	Opponent	Venue	Result	Scorers
16 June 1923	Nordia Rishon LeZion		2–2	
30 June 1923	Rehovot		3–0	
7 July 1923	OferTel Aviv		7–0	
21 July 1923	Maccabi Tel Aviv	Maccabi Petah Tikva ground	0–1	

=== Known friendly matches ===
Date	Opponent	Venue	Result	Scorers
14 October 1922	Wilhelma, Palestine	Maccabi Petah Tikva Ground	3–0	
11 November 1922	Ayala Tel Aviv	Palms Stadium	0–0	
25 November 1922	Ayala Tel Aviv	Maccabi Petah Tikva Ground	4–1	David Hoffman (2), Ackerman, Marcus Ze'ev
7 April 1923	Maccabi Nes Tziona		2–1	
