= Camille Cordahi =

Lebanese footballer (1919–2011)

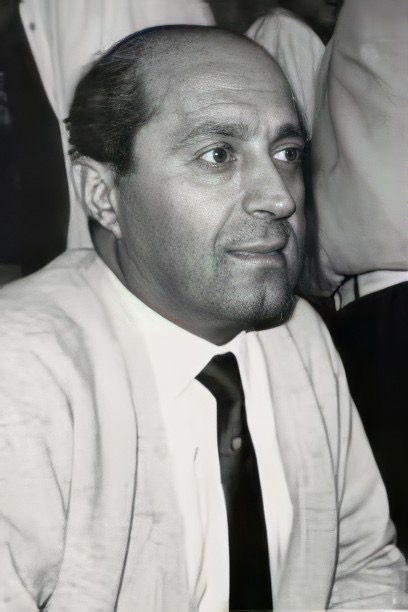
- Cordahi in 1964

Personal information
- Full name: Camille Rouhana Cordahi
- Date of birth: 11 September 1919
- Place of birth: Faitroun, Mount Lebanon, OETA West
- Date of death: 11 May 2011 (aged 91)
- Place of death: Lebanon
- Position: Forward

Youth career
- Collège de la Sagesse

Senior career*
Years	Team	Apps	(Gls)
1935–1942	DPHB		
1942–1943	Racing Beirut		
1943–1950	Sagesse		

International career
1940–1947	Lebanon	3	(1)
- * Club domestic league appearances and goals

Camille Rouhana Cordahi (Arabic: كميل روحانا قرداحي; 11 September 1919 – 11 May 2011) was a Lebanese footballer who played as a forward. He is the Lebanon national team's first official goalscorer, scoring his side's lone goal in a friendly game against Mandatory Palestine in 1940.

Cordahi began his senior club career in 1935 at DPHB, winning three Lebanese Premier League titles. In 1942 Cordahi played one season at Racing Beirut, before joining Sagesse in 1943, which he helped form. He remained at the club until his retirement in 1950.

Known as "the Golden Foot" (Arabic: القدم الذهبية), Cordahi represented Beirut XI unofficially as their captain between 1937 and 1950; his first official cap for Lebanon was the 1940 friendly against Mandatory Palestine, Lebanon's first official game, in which he scored.

Following his retirement as a player, Cordahi assumed various managerial roles at his former clubs Sagesse and Racing Beirut, and was the treasurer of the Lebanese Football Association in 1979. He was also the first mayor of his hometown Faitroun, and was awarded the Lebanese Medal of Merit in 1974.

== Early life ==
Cordahi was born on 11 September 1919 in Faitroun, Lebanon, to Rouhana Cordahi and Catherine Massaad. He had six siblings: Marie, Joseph, Georgette, Eva, Laure, and Marcelle. Cordahi grew up in the Achrafieh district of Beirut, and studied at the Sagesse High School, playing football for the school's team.

While studying at Sagesse, Cordahi was noticed by various French football clubs, who offered him to move to France with a scholarship. Cordahi's parents declined, and he remained in Lebanon.

== Club career ==
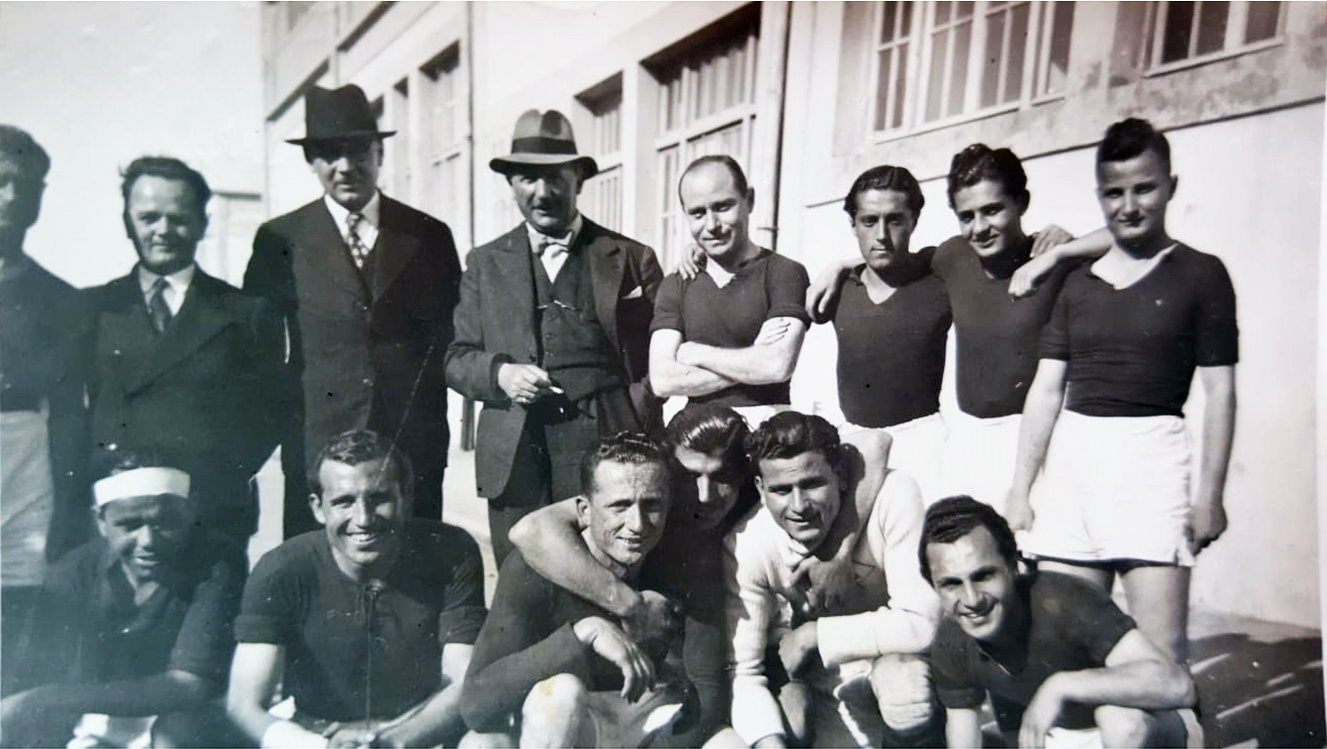
Cordahi (top row, third from right) with DPHB in 1939

Cordahi began his senior football career at DPHB, the football club of the Lebanese railways, in 1935; he played at the inaugural game of the Beirut Municipal Stadium that year, alongside teammate Joseph Nalbandian. With DPHB Cordahi won three Lebanese Premier League titles, in 1935–36, 1938–39, 1940–41.

In 1942 Cordahi moved to Racing Beirut for one season. In 1943 he helped Sagesse form a senior football team, playing their first season in the 1943–44 Lebanese Second Division. Cordahi helped Sagesse win the Second Division in their first season, but were not promoted to the Premier League. In 1947–48, he won the Second Division with Sagesse once again, gaining promotion back to the Premier League.

Cordahi retired from football in 1950, prior to Sagesse's relegation to the Second Division.

== International career ==
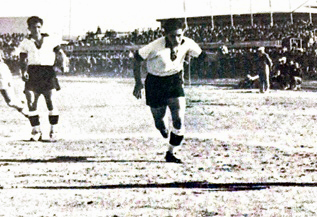
Cordahi with Lebanon against Mandatory Palestine in the friendly in 1940

Nicknamed "the Golden Foot" (Arabic: القدم الذهبية), in 1940 Cordahi took part in Lebanon's first international match, in a friendly against Mandatory Palestine. He scored Lebanon's lone goal of the match, assisted by Muhieddine Jaroudi of Hilmi Sports, becoming his country's first international goalscorer. Cordahi represented Lebanon twice more, in friendlies against Syria in 1942 and 1947.

Between 1937 and 1950, Cordahi also represented Beirut XI internationally as their captain in unofficial international games. In May 1946, he played for Beirut XI in a friendly game against Egyptian club Alexandria. Cordahi also received offers to play for the national teams of Syria and Palestine, but he declined.

== Managerial career ==
Following his retirement as a player, Cordahi worked at Sagesse first, and Racing Beirut later, as an administrator. On 18 January 1971, Cordahi was nominated sporting director of Racing Beirut by the club's General Assembly. In 1979 he was the treasurer of the Lebanese Football Association.

== Personal life ==
Cordahi worked for the Lebanese railways between 1935 and 1942, while playing for their football club DPHB. Between 1944 and 1953, Cordahi worked at Régie des Tabacs et Tombacs, a tobacco manufacturing and trade company. In 1962 he became the first mayor of his hometown Faitroun, an occupation he held for over 45 years.

On 1 June 1965, Cordahi founded a table tennis club, called Sporting Club Faitroun. The club was located in his home, and the table was put in his garage. In August 1974, Cordahi was awarded the Lebanese Medal of Merit at Racing Beirut's 40th anniversary.

On 15 December 1962, Cordahi married his wife Sonia Farid Rizk; the couple had three children: a son, Rouhana, and two daughters, Catherine and Zeina. Cordahi died on 11 May 2011.

== Career statistics ==
=== International ===
Scores and results list Lebanon's goal tally first, score column indicates score after each Lebanon goal.

List of international goals scored by Camille Cordahi
No.	Date	Venue	Opponent	Score	Result	Competition	Ref.
1	27 April 1940	Maccabiah Stadium, Tel Aviv, Mandatory Palestine	Mandatory Palestine	1–4	1–5	Friendly	

== Honours ==
DPHB

- Lebanese Premier League: 1935–36, 1938–39, 1940–41
- Lebanese FA Cup runner-up: 1939–40

Sagesse

- Lebanese Second Division: 1943–44, 1947–48
