= Lonia Dvorin =

Israeli footballer & coach (1917–2000)

Lonia Dvorin לוניה דבורין
Personal information
- Full name: Ari Dvorin
- Date of birth: 23 October 1917
- Place of birth: Odesa, Ukraine
- Date of death: 17 March 2000 (aged 82)
- Position: Full-back

Youth career
- –1934: Maccabi Tel Aviv

Senior career*
Years	Team	Apps	(Gls)
1934–1947	Beitar Tel Aviv		

International career
1940	Mandatory Palestine	1	(0)

Managerial career
- 1952–1954: Beitar Tel Aviv
- 1954: Beitar Jerusalem
- 1957–1958: Hapoel Be'er Sheva
- Maccabi Sha'arayim
- 1963: Hapoel Kfar Saba
- Maccabi Jaffa
- * Club domestic league appearances and goals

Aryeh "Lonia" Dvorin (Hebrew: לוניה דבורין; Ukrainian: Льоня Дворін; Russian: Лёня Дворин; 23 October 1917 – 17 March 2000) was an Israeli football player and coach. As a player, he played as a full-back for Beitar Tel Aviv and the Mandatory Palestine national team.

== Early life ==
Dvorin was born on 23 October 1917 in Odesa, Ukraine, to Hannah and Pinchas. When he was two years old, he and his family emigrated to Palestine on the Ruslan.

== Club career ==
Dvorin began his youth career as a teenager, joining Maccabi Tel Aviv's youth sector. He left the club in 1934, aged 17, and was one of the founders of Beitar Tel Aviv. He won the 1940 Palestine Cup after beating Maccabi Tel Aviv 3–1 in the final. In 1940, he enlisted in the British Army and served with the Jewish Brigade during World War II. In 1942 he won the cup once more, beating Maccabi Haifa 12–1 in the final; he scored the last goal of the game. Dvorin played his last season in 1947–48, when Beitar Tel Aviv where top of the league; however, the 1947–1949 Palestine war interrupted the season, which was never finished.

== International career ==
Dvorin took part in Mandatory Palestine's last international match against Lebanon in 1940, coming on as a substitute in the second half; it was his only international cap.

== Managerial career ==
In 1952 Dvorin began his managerial career at Beitar Tel Aviv. Towards the end of the 1953–54 Liga Bet, the second division, Dvorin joined Beitar Jerusalem, helping them gain promotion to the first division for the first time in their history. In his career, Dvorin coached many teams, including Hapoel Be'er Sheva, Maccabi Sha'arayim, Hapoel Kfar Saba, and Maccabi Jaffa.

== Personal life ==
At the age of 26, Dvorin married Shulamit Goldstein and lived with her in Tel Aviv. Upon the establishment of Israel, he joined Herut, a right-wing militant paramilitary group.

Dvorin's son, Danny, is a broadcaster and sports commentator in Israel. His brother, Haim, was a judge in the Tel Aviv District Court.

== Honours ==
=== Player ===
Beitar Tel Aviv

- Palestine League: 1944–45
- Tel Aviv Division 2: 1939
- Palestine Cup: 1940, 1942

=== Manager ===
Beitar Jerusalem

- Liga Bet: 1953–54
