= Salah Falah =

Lebanese footballer

Personal information
- Position: Midfielder

Senior career*
Years	Team	Apps	(Gls)
1938–1940	Hilmi-Sport		
1941	DPHB		
1943–1947	Sagesse		

International career
1940–1942	Lebanon	2	(0)

Managerial career
- 1946–1947: Sagesse
- * Club domestic league appearances and goals

Salah Falah (Arabic: صلاح فلاح) was a Lebanese football player, coach, and referee. Falah played as a midfielder for the Lebanon national team in their first official international match.

== Playing career ==
Falah played for Hilmi-Sport, DPHB, and Sagesse during the 1940s.

In 1934 the midfielder captained the Lebanon national team in their first unofficial match, against Romanian club CA Timișoara (T.A.C.). Falah also represented Lebanon in their first official international match, in 1940 against Mandatory Palestine.

== Managerial and referee career ==
In 1946–47 Falah coached Sagesse while a player. He was a referee during the 1960–61 season.

== See also ==
- List of Lebanon international footballers born outside Lebanon
