= Nazem Sayad =

Lebanese footballer

Personal information
- Place of birth: Tripoli, Lebanon
- Place of death: Tripoli, Lebanon
- Position: Goalkeeper

Senior career*
Years	Team	Apps	(Gls)
1938–1939	Hilmi-Sport		
1939–1940	Riada Wal Adab		

International career
1940	Lebanon	1	(0)
- * Club domestic league appearances and goals

Nazem Sayad (Arabic: ناظم صياد) was a Lebanese footballer who played as a goalkeeper.

He played for Hilmi-Sport and Riada Wal Adab at club level, and Lebanon internationally. Sayad took part in Lebanon's first international match against Mandatory Palestine in 1940.
