= Beirut Municipal Stadium =

Stadium in Beirut, Lebanon

- ملعب بيروت البلدي
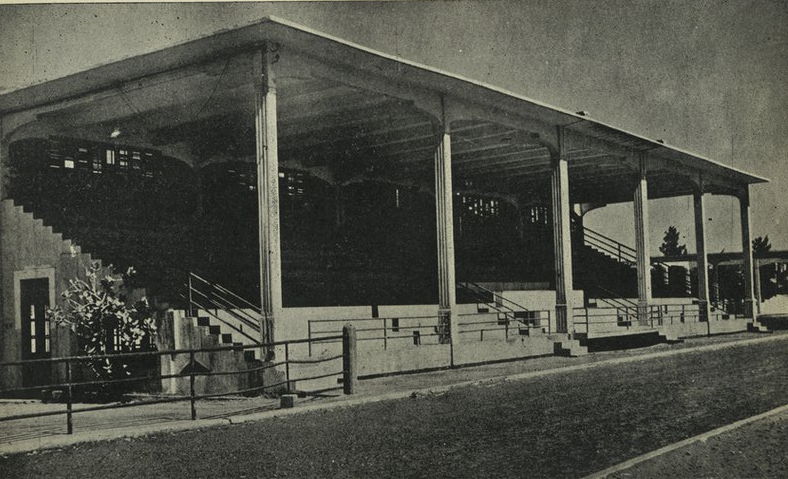
- Beirut Municipal Stadium in 1947
- Interactive map of Beirut Municipal Stadium
- Address: Rue Abou Chaker
- Coordinates: 33.87405°N 35.498393°E
- Capacity: 18,000

Construction
- Opened: 1935

Beirut Municipal Stadium (Arabic: ملعب بيروت البلدي) is an 18,000-capacity multi-purpose stadium in Beirut, Lebanon. It is currently mostly used for football matches.

== History ==
The stadium was built by the French colonials in 1935. DPHB played at the inaugural game of the stadium, with players such as Camille Cordahi and Joseph Nalbandian.
