= Jerard =

Jerard can be both a given name and a middle name. Notable people with the name include:

== Given name ==
- Jerard Ajemian (fl. 1940s), Lebanese football forward
- Jerard Hurwitz (1928–2019), American biochemist
- Jerard Rabb (born 1984), American American football wide receiver

== Middle name ==
- David Jerard Moss (born 1983), American basketball coach and former player
- Archibald Jerard Weaver (1843–1887), American lawyer, jurist, and politician

== See also ==
- Gerard, masculine given name of Proto-Germanic origin
