= 1931–32 Palestine League =

Palestine League
- Season: 1931–32
- Champions: British Police
- Matches played: 65
- Goals scored: 298 (4.58 per match)

The 1931–32 Palestine League was the first complete season of league football in the British Mandate for Palestine, and the first played in an autumn-spring format. Although in previous seasons several leagues were contested, none are recognized by the Israeli Football Association.

The season began on 7 November 1931 and its final matches were played on 27 May 1932. Seven matches were left un-played as a dispute between Hapoel and Maccabi factions within the EIFA following the punishment given to Hapoel Haifa following the events that led to the abandonment of the cup final halted all EIFA activities.

The championship was won by British Police, who finished the season unbeaten.

== League table ==
| Pos | Team | Pld | W | D | L | GF | GA | GR | Pts | BPO | HTA | HHA | MHJ | MTA | MPT | MHA | MNZ | HJE |
|---|---|---|---|---|---|---|---|---|---|---|---|---|---|---|---|---|---|---|
| 1 | British Police (C) | 15 | 12 | 3 | 0 | 62 | 18 | 3.444 | 27 | — | 4–2 | 2–0 | 5–2 | 9–0 | 7–1 | – (Note: Seven matches were left un-played due to disagreement between Hapoel and Maccabi organizations.) | 3–1 | 10–1 |
| 2 | Hapoel Tel Aviv | 15 | 11 | 2 | 2 | 52 | 13 | 4.000 | 24 | 1–1 | — | 0–1 | 7–1 | 5–1 | 5–1 | 5–2 | 6–0 | 8–0 |
| 3 | Hapoel Haifa | 12 | 8 | 2 | 2 | 33 | 15 | 2.200 | 18 | 3–3 | 0–2 | — | 0–0 | 5–0 | 4–3 | 7–0 | 3–0 | – |
| 4 | Maccabi Hashmonai | 15 | 8 | 2 | 5 | 35 | 32 | 1.094 | 18 | 1–2 | 1–3 | – | — | 2–0 | 2–1 | 3–1 | 1–0 | 8–0 |
| 5 | Maccabi Tel Aviv | 15 | 7 | 2 | 6 | 37 | 38 | 0.974 | 16 | 2–2 | 1–1 | 1–3 | 2–3 | — | 3–1 | 4–2 | 3–2 | – |
| 6 | Maccabi Petah Tikva | 16 | 4 | 1 | 11 | 30 | 45 | 0.667 | 9 | 2–4 | 0–2 | 2–3 | 3–4 | 2–5 | — | 0–2 | 1–1 | 5–0 |
| 7 | Maccabi Haifa | 14 | 3 | 2 | 9 | 22 | 42 | 0.524 | 8 | 1–4 | – | 2–4 | 4–2 | 0–4 | 2–3 | — | 1–1 | 1–1 |
| 8 | Maccabi Nes Tziona | 15 | 2 | 3 | 10 | 16 | 35 | 0.457 | 7 | 1–3 | 0–2 | – | 2–2 | 0–4 | 1–3 | 1–0 | — | 1–3 |
| 9 | Hapoel Jerusalem | 13 | 1 | 1 | 11 | 11 | 60 | 0.183 | 3 | 0–3 | 0–3 | – | 2–3 | 1–7 | 0–2 | 3–4 | 0–5 | — |

Updated to match(es) played on 27 May 1932. Source: IFA, Do'ar HaYom
(C) Champions
