= Binyamin Mizrahi =

Israeli footballer (1916–2001)

Binyamin Mizrahi בנימין מזרחי
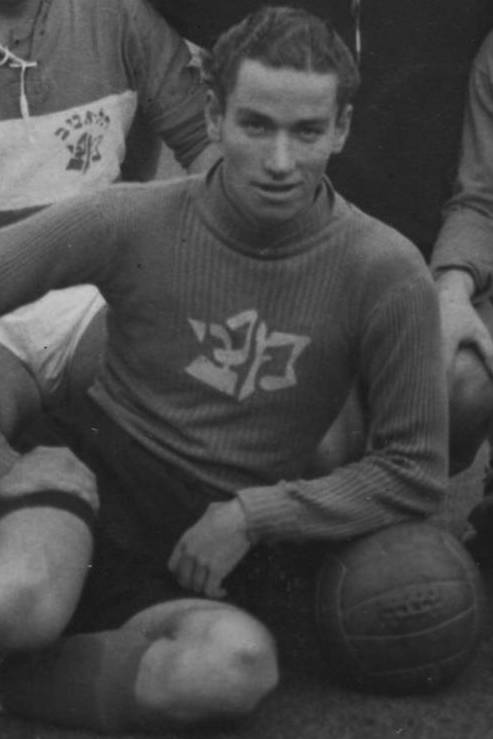
- Mizrahi with Maccabi Tel Aviv in 1939

Personal information
- Date of birth: 11 November 1916
- Date of death: 25 March 2001 (aged 84)
- Position: Goalkeeper

Senior career*
Years	Team	Apps	(Gls)
1939	Maccabi Tel Aviv	0	(0)
1940	Beitar Tel Aviv		

International career
1940	Mandatory Palestine	1	(0)
- * Club domestic league appearances and goals

Binyamin Mizrahi (Hebrew: בנימין מזרחי; 11 November 1916 – 25 March 2001) was an Israeli footballer who played as a goalkeeper for Maccabi Tel Aviv and Beitar Tel Aviv at club level, and the Mandatory Palestine national team internationally.

Mizrahi took part in Mandatory Palestine's last international match against Lebanon in 1940; it was his only international cap.
