= Yeghishe Darian =

Lebanese footballer

Personal information
- Position: Full-back

Senior career*
Years	Team	Apps	(Gls)
1939–1940	DPHB		
1940–1946	Homenetmen		

International career
1940–1947	Lebanon	2	(0)
- * Club domestic league appearances and goals

Yeghishe Darian (Arabic: يغيشه داريان), also spelled Yeguiché or Jeugiche, was a Lebanese footballer who played as a full-back.

He played for DPHB and Homenetmen at club level, and the Lebanon national team internationally. Darian took part in Lebanon's first international match against Mandatory Palestine in 1940, and played for Beirut XI in 1946.
