= Yaacov Breir =

Israeli footballer (1910–1953)

Yaacov Netanyahu Breir יעקב ברייר
Personal information
- Date of birth: 9 May 1910
- Date of death: 3 April 1953
- Place of death: Akkar, Lebanon
- Position: Full-back

Senior career*
| Years | Team | Apps | (Gls) |
| 1940 | Hapoel Haifa | | |

International career
| 1940 | Mandatory Palestine | 1 | (0) |
- * Club domestic league appearances and goals

Yaacov Netanyahu Breir (Hebrew: יעקב ברייר; 9 May 1910 - April 3 1953) was an Israeli footballer who played as a full-back for Hapoel Haifa and the Mandatory Palestine national team. He is believed to have been killed in Lebanon in April 1953, while visiting relatives.

Breir was regarded as one of Hapoel Haifa's greatest players of the early era. Breir took part in Mandatory Palestine's last international match against Lebanon in 1940; it was his only international cap.
