= Oksen Ourfalian =

Lebanese footballer

Personal information
- Position: Forward

Senior career*
Years	Team	Apps	(Gls)
1940–1941	Homenetmen Beirut		
1942	Homenetmen Jerusalem		
1944–1945	Shabiba Mazraa		

International career
1940	Lebanon	1	(0)
- * Club domestic league appearances and goals

Oksen Ourfalian (Arabic: أوكسن أورفليان) also spelled Oxen, was a Lebanese footballer who played as a forward.

== Club career ==
Ourfalian played for Homenetmen Beirut in Lebanon in 1940, before moving to Palestine at Homenetmen Jerusalem in 1942.

== International career ==
Ourfalian took part in Lebanon's first international match against Mandatory Palestine in 1940.
