= Antoine Sakr =

Lebanese footballer

Personal information
- Position: Full-back

Senior career*
Years	Team	Apps	(Gls)
1940	DPHB		
1941–1942	Racing Beirut		
1943–1946	Sagesse		

International career
1940–1942	Lebanon	2	(0)
- * Club domestic league appearances and goals

Antoine Sakr (Arabic: انطوان صقر; also spelled Sacre) was a Lebanese footballer who played as an full-back.

He played for DPHB, Racing Beirut, and Sagesse at club level, and the Lebanon national team internationally. Sakr took part in Lebanon's first international match against Mandatory Palestine in 1940, and played for Beirut XI in 1946.
