= Nercesse =

Lebanese footballer

Personal information
- Position: Forward

Senior career*
Years	Team	Apps	(Gls)
1939–1941	DPHB		
1941–1942	Homenetmen		
1943–1944	Antranik		
1945–1946	Sagesse		
1946–1947	Homenetmen		

International career
1940	Lebanon	1	(0)
- * Club domestic league appearances and goals

Nercesse (last name unknown; Arabic: نارسيس), also spelled Narcis, was a Lebanese footballer who played as a forward.

Nercesse played for DPHB, Homenetmen, Antranik, and Sagesse at club level. He took part in Lebanon's first international match against Mandatory Palestine in 1940.

== Honours ==
DPHB

- Lebanese Premier League: 1940–41
- Lebanese FA Cup runner-up: 1939–40
