= 1940 Palestine League =

Football league

Palestine League
- Season: 1940
- Champions: Hapoel Tel Aviv; 4th title
- Matches played: 54
- Goals scored: 210 (3.89 per match)

The 1940 Palestine League was the eighth season of league football in the British Mandate for Palestine. The defending champions were Hapoel Tel Aviv.

Eight clubs took part in the league. The league was played between 27 January and 29 June 1940. All clubs completed their schedule of 14 matches.

The championship was won by defending champions Hapoel Tel Aviv.

== League table ==
Pos	Team	Pld	W	D	L	GF	GA	GR	Pts		HTA	BTA	MTA	MNZ	HHF	HKT	MPT	HHZ
1	Hapoel Tel Aviv	14	10	3	1	31	12	2.583	23	Champions	—	1–0	2–1	0–0	1–1	5–2	2–1	6–0
2	Beitar Tel Aviv	14	8	3	3	43	8	5.375	19		3–0	—	0–0	9–0	4–2	0–0	3–0	7–0
3	Maccabi Tel Aviv	14	8	2	4	46	14	3.286	18		1–2	0–2	—	0–3	1–3	3–0	8–1	11–0
4	Maccabi Nes Tziona	14	6	4	4	24	27	0.889	16		1–1	1–0	1–4	—	3–1	1–1	2–3	4–1
5	Hapoel Haifa	14	5	2	7	22	34	0.647	12		0–3	2–4	0–5	2–3	—	2–1	3–2	3–0
6	Hakoah Tel Aviv	14	4	4	6	11	25	0.440	12		0–3	0–0	1–1	2–1	0–2	—	1–0	1–0
7	Maccabi Petah Tikva	14	5	0	9	32	42	0.762	10		1–3	0–9	1–5	1–2	7–1	7–1	—	2–0
8	Hapoel Herzliya	14	0	2	12	6	53	0.113	2		1–2	0–4	0–4	2–2	0–0	0–1	2–6	—

Updated to match(es) played on 29 June 1940. Source: 100 Years of Football 1906-2006, Elisha Shohat (Israel), 2006
