= Guiragos =

Lebanese footballer

Personal information
- Position: Midfielder

Senior career*
Years	Team	Apps	(Gls)
1940–1946	Homenetmen		

International career
1940	Lebanon	1	(0)
- * Club domestic league appearances and goals

Guiragos (last name unknown; Arabic: غيراغوس), also spelled Gyrakos, was a Lebanese footballer who played as a midfielder.

Guiragos played for Homenetmen during the 1940s at club level. He took part in Lebanon's first international match against Mandatory Palestine in 1940.
