= Zvi Fuchs =

Israeli footballer (1917–1999)

Zvi Fuchs צבי פוקס
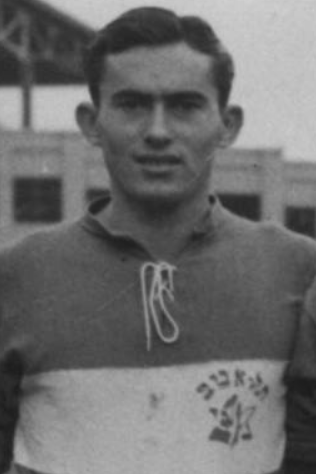
- Fuchs with Maccabi Tel Aviv in 1939

Personal information
- Date of birth: 12 April 1917
- Place of birth: Poland
- Date of death: 10 March 1999 (aged 81)
- Position: Midfielder

Senior career*
Years	Team	Apps	(Gls)
1936–1942	Maccabi Tel Aviv	17	(1)
1943–1950	Beitar Tel Aviv		

International career
1940	Mandatory Palestine	1	(0)
- * Club domestic league appearances and goals

Zvi Fuchs (Hebrew: צבי פוקס; 12 April 1917 – 10 March 1999) was an Israeli footballer who played as a midfielder.

== Early life ==
Fuchs was born in Poland on 12 April 1917, and immigrated with his family to Mandatory Palestine in 1920.

== Club career ==
In the 1935–36 season, Fuchs made his senior debut for Maccabi Tel Aviv aged 19. On 5 March 1938, Fuchs scored his first goal in the Palestine Cup, in the quarterfinals against Maccabi Nes Tziona, helping his side win 3–1.

== International career ==
Fuchs represented Mandatory Palestine at international level in their last international match against Lebanon in 1940; it was his only international cap.
