= Zvi Erlich =

Israeli football player and manager (1909–1983)

Zvi Erlich צבי ארליך
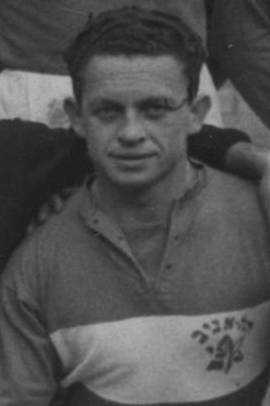
- Erlich with Maccabi Tel Aviv in 1939

Personal information
- Date of birth: 7 November 1909
- Date of death: 17 June 1983 (aged 73)
- Position: Forward

Senior career*
Years	Team	Apps	(Gls)
1939	Maccabi Tel Aviv	0	(0)
1939–1945	Hapoel Tel Aviv		

International career
1940	Mandatory Palestine	1	(0)

Managerial career
- 1951–1953: Hapoel Ramat Gan Givatayim
- 1954–1956: Hapoel Tel Aviv
- 1957–1958: Hapoel Kfar Saba
- 1966–1967: Maccabi Tel Aviv
- * Club domestic league appearances and goals

Zvi Erlich (Hebrew: צבי ארליך; 7 November 1909 – 17 June 1983), also nicknamed Doctor (Hebrew: דוקטור), was an Israeli football player and manager. As a player, he played as a forward for Hapoel Tel Aviv and the Mandatory Palestine national team. Erlich took part in Mandatory Palestine's last international match against Lebanon in 1940; it was his only international cap.
