= Toufic Barbir =

Lebanese footballer

Personal information
- Position: Midfielder

Senior career*
Years	Team	Apps	(Gls)
1939–1941	DPHB		

International career
1940	Lebanon	1	(0)
- * Club domestic league appearances and goals

Toufic Barbir (Arabic: تَوْفِيق بَرْبِير) was a Lebanese footballer who played as a midfielder for DPHB and the Lebanon national team. Barbir took part in Lebanon's first international match against Mandatory Palestine in 1940.
