= Shalom Shalomzon =

Israeli footballer (1919–1975)

Shalom Shalomzon שלום שלומזון
Personal information
- Date of birth: 27 September 1919
- Place of birth: Romania
- Date of death: 1 November 1975 (aged 56)
- Position: Full-back

Senior career*
Years	Team	Apps	(Gls)
1935–1954	Maccabi Tel Aviv	34	(3)

International career
1940	Mandatory Palestine	1	(0)
1948	Israel	1	(0)
- * Club domestic league appearances and goals

Shalom Shalomzon (Hebrew: שלום שלומזון; 27 September 1919 – 1 November 1975) was an Israeli footballer who played as a full-back for Maccabi Tel Aviv.

Shalomzon made his senior international debut in Mandatory Palestine's last international match against Lebanon in 1940; he also represented Israel in 1948.
