= Faitroun =

Faitroun فيطرون
- Municipality
- Location within Lebanon
- Coordinates: 33°59′31″N 35°44′15″E
- Country: Lebanon
- Governorate: Keserwan-Jbeil
- District: Keserwan

Area
  - Total: 7.43 km^{2} (2.87 sq mi)
- Elevation: 1,200 m (3,900 ft)
- Highest elevation: 1,350 m (4,430 ft)
- Time zone: UTC+2 (EET)
  - Summer (DST): UTC+3 (EEST)
- Dialing code: +961

Faitroun (Arabic: فيطرون, romanized: Fayṭrūn; also spelled Faytroun) is a town in the Keserwan District of Keserwan-Jbeil Governorate. Located 33 kilometers north of Beirut and at an average altitude of 1,200 meters above sea level and its total land area of 743 hectares. Its inhabitants are predominantly Maronite Christians. Faitroun has a public school, which had 229 students as of 2008. The town is home to a number of hotels and restaurants.

The name of the town is a derivative of the Aramaic words meaning "throne of the lord". Some of the main attractions in the town are the Church of Saint George, which was built in the 18th century and the ancient citadel with wells.

== History ==
According to the 17th-century historian and Maronite patriarch Istifan al-Duwayhi, Faitroun was settled by Sunni Muslims from the Beqaa Valley in the 16th century. Ottoman tax records indicate the village had 23 Muslim households, two bachelors and one imam in 1523, 42 Muslim households, eight bachelors and no imams in 1530, and 43 Muslim households in 1543.

In 1838, Eli Smith noted Feitirun as a village located in "Aklim el-Kesrawan, Northeast of Beirut; the chief seat of the Maronites".

== Notable people ==
- Camille Cordahi (1919–2011), footballer
- George Kordahi (born 1950), TV presenter

== Bibliography ==
- Bakhit, Muhammad Adnan Salamah (February 1972). The Ottoman Province of Damascus in the Sixteenth Century (PhD). School of Oriental and African Studies, University of London.
- Robinson, E.; Smith, E. (1841). Biblical Researches in Palestine, Mount Sinai and Arabia Petraea: A Journal of Travels in the year 1838. Vol. 3. Boston: Crocker & Brewster.
