= Muhieddine Jaroudi =

Lebanese footballer

Personal information
- Position: Forward

Senior career*
Years	Team	Apps	(Gls)
1933	Riyadi Beirut		
1938–1939	Nahda		
1939–1940	Hilmi-Sport		
1941–1942	Racing Beirut		
1943–1944	Nahda		

International career
1940–1947	Lebanon	3	(0)
- * Club domestic league appearances and goals

Muhieddine Jaroudi (Arabic: محي الدين الجارودي) was a Lebanese footballer who played as a forward.

A player for Riyadi Beirut, Nahda, Hilmi-Sport, and Racing Beirut, Jaroudi took part in Lebanon's first international match against Mandatory Palestine in 1940, assisting Lebanon's lone goal of the game.
