= 1940 Mandatory Palestine v Lebanon football match =

International association football match

Mandatory Palestine v Lebanon
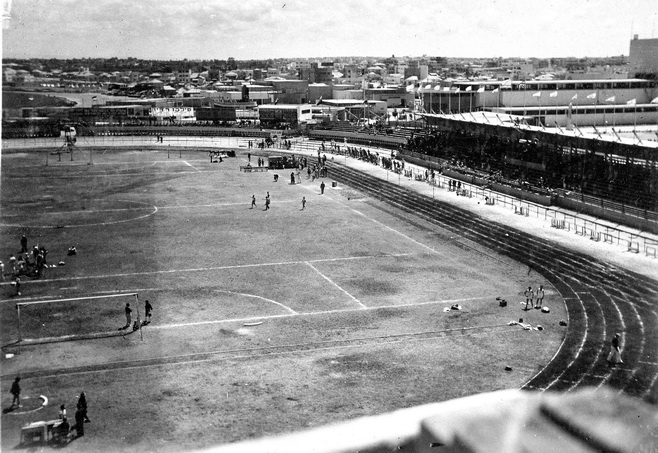
- The Maccabiah Stadium (pictured in 1935), where the match was held
- Event: International friendly
Mandatory Palestine	Lebanon
5	1
- Date: 27 April 1940
- Venue: Maccabiah Stadium, Tel Aviv
- Referee: John Blackwell (England)
- Attendance: 10,000

The 1940 association football match between the national teams of Mandatory Palestine and Lebanon was the latter's first official international match, and the former's last before they became the Israel national team after 1948. The match took place on 27 April 1940 at the Maccabiah Stadium in Tel Aviv. Officiated by John Blackwell of the British Army, the game was watched by between 6,000 and 10,000 spectators and ended in a 5–1 victory for the home side.

Palestine scored in the second minute of the game, doubling their lead 10 minutes later with a penalty kick. Two more goals by the home side meant the first half ended 4–0. Palestine's forced substitution at half-time due to injury hampered their control of the game and in the fifth minute of the second half, Lebanese forward Camille Cordahi scored to become Lebanon's first official international goalscorer. Werner Kaspi scored his second goal of the game in the 60th minute, with the match ending 5–1.

Lebanon's next official games were all friendlies against Syria, one in 1942 and two in 1947. In 1948 the Mandatory Palestine national team formally became the Israel national team, with the establishment of the State of Israel. They played their next official game in a friendly against Cyprus in 1949. Out of Lebanon's 11 players, six went on to play at least one more international game. Shalom Shalomzon was the only Palestine player to make another international appearance.

== Background ==
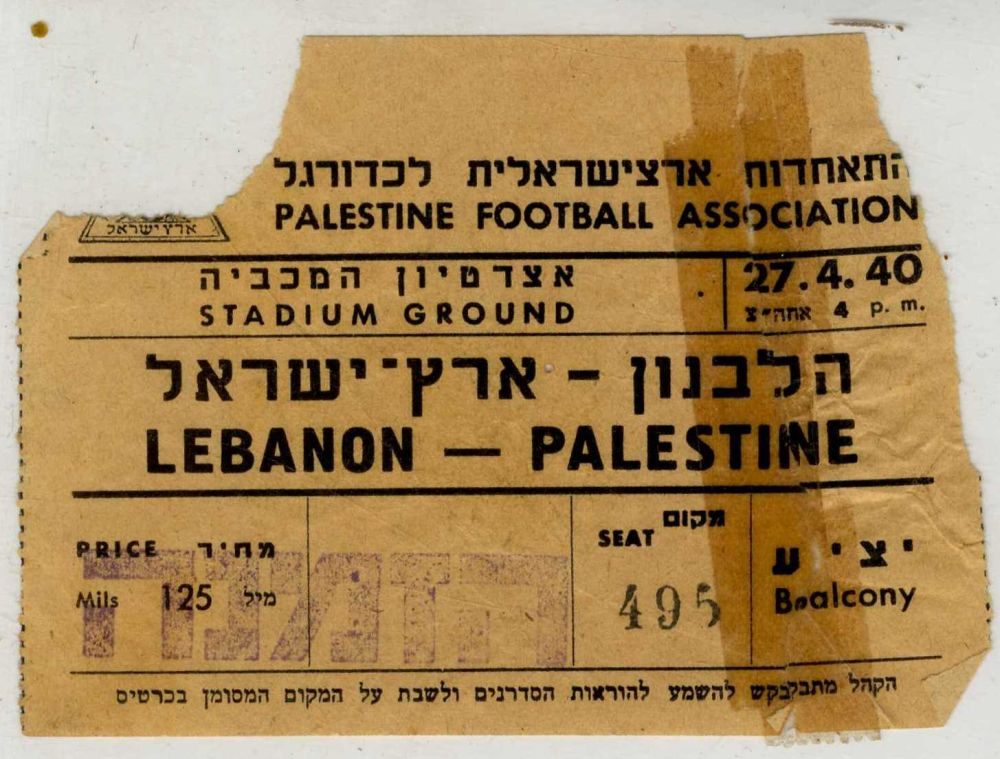
A ticket to the match between Mandatory Palestine and Lebanon.

During the 1930s, Lebanon was a regular destination for friendly tours by football clubs in Mandatory Palestine. Teams such as Maccabi Tel Aviv, Maccabi Petah Tikva, and Maccabi Haifa regularly played teams from Beirut, Tyre, and Sidon. At the end of 1939, Lebanese Football Association (LFA) chairman Jamil Sawaya visited family in Jerusalem and Jaffa. Sawaya had friendly relations with several presidents of Palestinian football clubs, especially with the president of the Palestine Football Association (PFA). During his visit to Jerusalem, Sawaya met with the PFA president, and approximately three weeks before the match, the Palestinian Jewish national team extended an invitation to the LFA to participate in a friendly match in Tel Aviv. The Lebanese team accepted the invitation, and the match was scheduled for 27 April 1940.

Plans were announced in late March 1940 for a four-team football tournament with the national teams of Palestine and Lebanon, and teams from the British Army in Palestine and the French Army in Lebanon. However, with the two armies put on alert in mid-April in anticipation of the Battle of France, the tournament was called off and only the match between Palestine and Lebanon went ahead. The Lebanese team departed Beirut on Friday, 26 April, and arrived in Tel Aviv that afternoon, staying at the Central Hotel, which was located in front of the beach. The LFA delegation was led by President Jamil Sawaya and included Secretary-General Jean Arab, among others. The team travelled despite the absence of five first-team players—Emile Nassar, Labib Majdalani, Garabed Saatchi, Salim Hawi, and Chaya—due to work commitments. As a result, five reserve players were included in the squad.

The game was set for 27 April 1940 at the Maccabiah Stadium, located on the banks of the Yarkon River estuary in Tel Aviv. On the eve of the game, the Palestinian players, mostly Jewish, were invited to tea and cake at a café on Rothschild Boulevard. They were told that each player had to go to the locker room at the stadium on their own. The players did not train for the game and, in the small dressing room, 14 received the light-blue-and-white kit. Arthur Baar, an Austrian football coach, was in charge of selecting the Palestine team, sending out the call-ups to the players. Baar became the de facto coach as Egon Pollak, the team's coach at that point, was spending time in Australia. On the day of the match, Baar invited Armin Weiss, Maccabi Tel Aviv's coach, to serve as the acting coach of the game. Weiss accepted the task, giving the Palestinian players a pre-match talk, and instructing them from the sidelines during the match.

== Match ==
The match was Lebanon's first official international game, and proved to be Mandatory Palestine's last. Palestine had previously played and lost four official games, all FIFA World Cup qualifiers (two in 1934 and two in 1938). Lebanon, on the other hand, had only played a few unofficial games prior, against clubs from Romania (CA Timișoara and Unirea Tricolor București) and Austria (Admira Vienna). The stadium was decorated with the flags of both nations, and estimates of the attendance vary, with sources reporting around 10,000 spectators, many of whom were British, while others suggest a figure closer to 6,000, including a significant number of Arab fans. The referee was John Blackwell of the British Army.

=== Summary ===
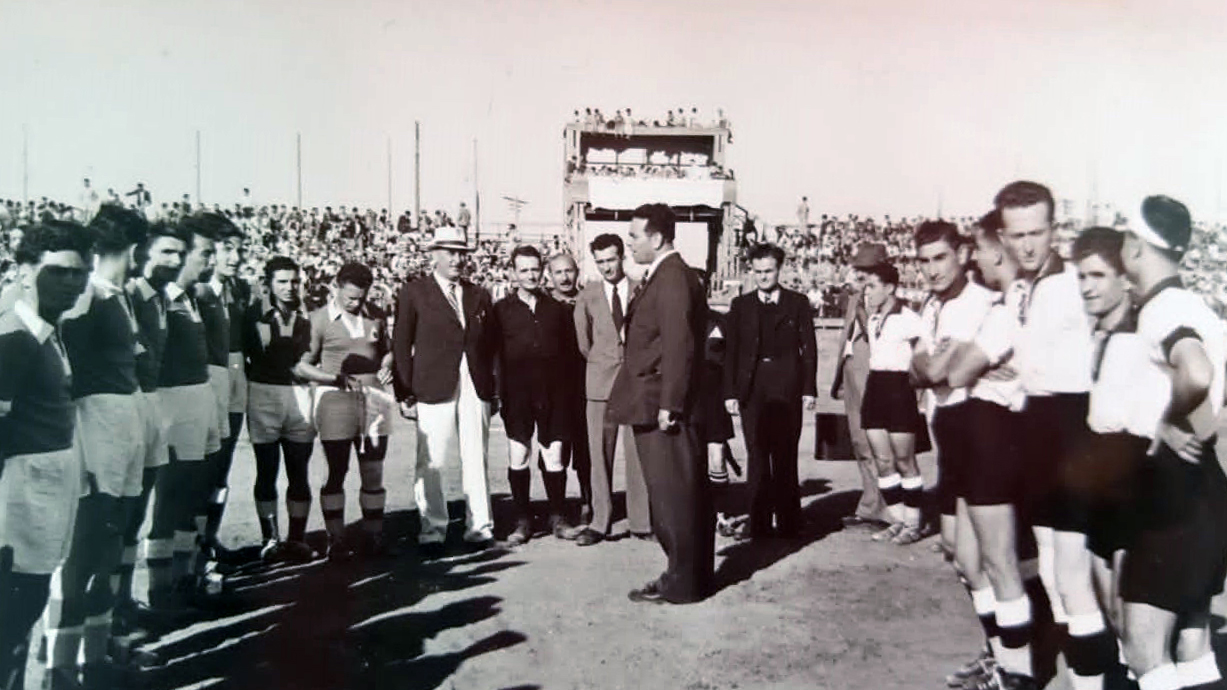
The line-ups of Mandatory Palestine (left) and Lebanon (right) before the match

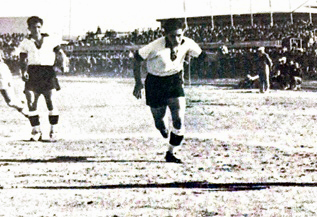
Lebanese forward Camille Cordahi, who scored Lebanon's first official international goal

In the first half, Palestine played against the wind. In the second minute of the game, Palestinian right winger Herbert Meitner scored against Lebanese goalkeeper Nazem Sayad. This was followed by a penalty kick by Avraham Schneiderovitz in the 11th minute, doubling the advantage for the home side. Although the Lebanese team began to respond offensively, they failed to score against goalkeeper Binyamin Mizrahi, who made several saves. Mizrahi was especially cheered by the crowd for his two saves in the 18th and 23rd minute. Palestine regained control of the game later in the first half and in the 31st minute Gaul Machlis scored his team's third goal. He was assisted from the left wing and ran around the defence to score into an empty goal. In the 40th minute Werner Kaspi, the Palestine captain, scored a solo effort, with the first half ending 4–0. Mizrahi saved eight shots from Lebanon in the first half, several drawing "wonder from the crowd", whereas goalkeeper Sayad was described as having "had much work".

The second half was more balanced; Lebanon played against the wind. Palestinian centre-half Zvi Fuchs was replaced at halftime by left-back Lonia Dvorin following an injury, and left-back Yaacov Breir moved up to centre-half. The change hindered Palestine's control of the game. Lebanese forward Camille Cordahi scored against Mizrahi in the 50th minute, with Muhieddine Jaroudi providing the assist; Cordahi was Lebanon's first official international goalscorer. A few moments after the goal, Jaroudi crossed the ball to the centre, with Mizrahi getting low and comfortably collecting the ball. Lebanon tried to attack twice more, before the offensive momentum passed to Palestine. In the 60th minute Kaspi scored his second goal of the game. After the goal, the Lebanese coach asked Palestine coach Arthur Baar to go easy. Baar later stated that the Lebanese coach had sought to maintain good relations between the two countries, and asked not to defeat them in a harsh manner. The home side began to pass the ball back and forth, and won by a final score of 5–1.

The match was Lebanon's first international, and their first defeat. Mandatory Palestine's win was their first (and only) in a match before they became the Israel national team after 1948.

=== Details ===
27 April 1940
16:00 UTC+3

Mandatory Palestine	5–1	Lebanon
Meitner 2'; Schneiderovitz 11' (pen.); Machlis 32'; Kaspi 40', 60'	Report	Cordahi 50'

Maccabiah Stadium, Tel Aviv
Attendance: 10,000
Referee: John Blackwell (England)

Mandatory Palestine	Lebanon

GK	Binyamin Mizrahi (Beitar Tel Aviv)
RB	Shalom Shalomzon (Maccabi Tel Aviv)
LB	Yaacov Breir (Hapoel Haifa)
RH	Zalman Friedmann (Hapoel Tel Aviv)
CH	Zvi Fuchs (Maccabi Tel Aviv)	(substituted off) 46'
LH	Haim Reich (Hapoel Tel Aviv)
OR	Herbert Meitner (Hapoel Rishon)
IR	Zvi Erlich (Hapoel Tel Aviv)
CF	Werner Kaspi (c) (Beitar Tel Aviv)
IL	Avraham Schneiderovitz (Maccabi Nes Tziona)
OL	Gaul Machlis (Maccabi Tel Aviv)
Substitutions:
GK	Asi Asher (Hakoah Tel Aviv)
LB	Lonia Dvorin (Beitar Tel Aviv)	(substituted on) 46'
CF	Peri Neufeld (Maccabi Tel Aviv)
Manager:
Arthur Baar

GK	Nazem Sayad (Riada Wal Adab)
RB	Yeghishe Darian (DPHB)
LB	Antoine Sakr (DPHB)
RH	Guiragos (Homenetmen)
CH	Toufic Barbir (DPHB)
LH	Salah Falah (Hilmi-Sport)
OR	Muhieddine Jaroudi (Hilmi-Sport)
IR	Nercesse (DPHB)
CF	Camille Cordahi (DPHB)
IL	Oksen Ourfalian (Homenetmen)
OL	Jerard Ajemian (Homenetmen)

== Aftermath ==
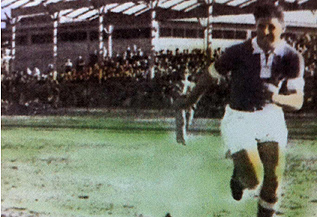
Palestinian forward Gaul Machlis running towards the goal

=== Post-match ===
The Palestine Post described the match as "rather one-sided" and stated it had not lived up to expectations, with the home side both physically and technically superior. In general, it wrote, the Palestine team played efficiently throughout the whole game; exceptions being the two full-backs (Shalomzon and Dvorin), who were not deemed up to par in the second half. Despite the scoreline, Palestinian goalkeeper Mizrahi had been kept busy. With his two goals, captain Werner Kaspi became the first player of the Israel national team (Mandatory Palestine's successor) to score a brace. Following the game, commentators expressed surprise regarding coach Arthur Baar's decision to exclude Peri Neufeld from the match, given that he was one of "Palestine's most prominent players at the time".

Although the Palestinian forwards scored five goals between them, Lebanese goalkeeper Sayad made many saves, several "brilliantly", and played very well; "[t]he goals that did get past him would have beaten any custodian", the Post wrote. HaBoker added: "The Lebanese goalkeeper doesn't bear any responsibility for the five goals and he's not to blame for them". Lebanon's front line was their "weakest link", the Post continued, with centre-forward Cordahi and outside-right Jaroudi being the only two "up to international standard". Although Lebanon's midfield was not "very effective", their back line played particularly well, especially Yeghishe Darian at right-back.

After the game, Palestinian fans enthusiastically waited outside the locker room to greet the players. The last two players to come out of the stadium were Dvorin, who supported his injured teammate Fuchs. Both walked to the Hadassah Hospital for Fuchs to receive treatment. The match generated approximately 180 Palestinian pounds in revenue, with the LFA receiving 100 pounds. The two coaches agreed for another friendly match, to be held in Beirut, Lebanon, in 1941. However, the match never came to fruition. LFA president Jamil Sawaya, who had led the Lebanese delegation, expressed dissatisfaction with the performance of referee John Blackwell, stating that he was "not up to standards". Sawaya also emphasized that the trip was not solely for the match but also to visit Palestine, a country he referred to as a "sister nation". The Lebanese team returned to Beirut the following morning due to work obligations.

=== Later international careers ===
Lebanon's next official matches were all friendlies against Syria—one in 1942 and two in 1947—losing all three games. Israel did not play their first official match under their new identity until 1949, in a friendly against Cyprus, although they played an unofficial match against the United States Olympic team in 1948.

Regarding Palestine's 12 players involved, the match was the only appearance for eight (Mizrahi, Breir, Fuchs, Meitner, Erlich, Kaspi, Schneiderovitz, Dvorin), and the last cap for three (Friedmann, Reich, Machlis). Shalomzon, who debuted in the game, would become the only player of the match to go on to make an appearance for the Israel national team—albeit unofficial—playing in the 1948 friendly against the United States. As for the two unused substitutes, Neufeld's only two international caps were in the 1938 FIFA World Cup qualifiers, where he scored once, whereas Asi Asher would ultimately never be capped at international level, neither for Mandatory Palestine nor for Israel.

The game was the only cap for five of Lebanon's eleven players (Sayad, Guiragos, Barbir, Nercesse, Ourfalian). Three players went on to play another game against Syria: Sakr and Falah on 19 April 1942, and Darian on 4 May 1947. The remaining three players played two more friendlies, all against Syria: Cordahi on 19 April 1942 and 4 May 1947, Jaroudi on 19 April 1942 and 18 May 1947, and Ajemian on 4 May 1947 and 18 May 1947.

== See also ==
- List of first association football internationals per country: 1940–1962
- Lebanon national football team results
- Israel–Lebanon relations

== Bibliography ==
- Khalidi, Issam (2013). One Hundred Years of Football in Palestine. Amman: Dar Al-Shorouk. ISBN 9796500159331.
- Shohat, Elisha (2006). 100 שנות כדורגל: 1906–2006 [100 Years of Football: 1906–2006] (in Hebrew). Hod Hasharon: Elisha Shohat. OCLC 81250355.
