= AS DPHB =

Defunct Lebanese multi-sports club

DPHB
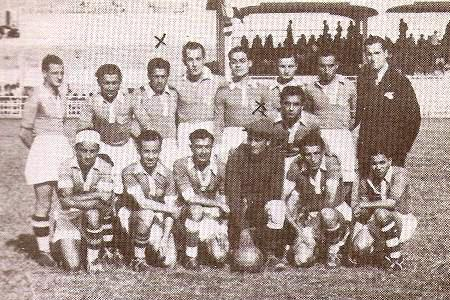
- DPHB in 1935
- Full name: Association Sportive DPHB
- Nickname: Les Cheminots (The Railway Workers)
- Ground: DPHB Stadium
Home colours

Association Sportive DPHB, (Note: Also sometimes shortened to DHP (French: Damas-Hamah et Prolongements)) known as Al Sikkat Al Hadid Wal Marfa' in Arabic (Arabic: نادي السكة الحديد والمرفأ, lit. 'Railway and Port Club'), (Note: Or simply Sikka (Arabic: السكة)) was a multi-sports club based in Forn El Chebbak, a district in Beirut, Lebanon.

DPHB, which was the sports club of the Lebanese railways company, was mainly known for their football team. They also used to practice basketball, volleyball, table tennis, and swimming. DPHB won the Lebanese Premier League three times: in 1935–36, 1938–39, and 1940–41.

== History ==
In 1935, DPHB played at the inaugural game of the Beirut Municipal Stadium with players such as Camille Cordahi and Joseph Nalbandian. Five DPHB players were present in Lebanon's lineup during their first international match against Mandatory Palestine in 1940: Yeghishe Darian, Antoine Sakr, Toufic Barbir, Nercesse, and Cordahi.

== Honours ==
- Lebanese Premier League
  - Winners (3): 1935–36, 1938–39, 1940–41
- Lebanese FA Cup
  - Runners-up (1): 1939–40
