= Arthur Baar =

Austrian football manager (1890–1984)

Personal information
- Date of birth: 1890
- Place of birth: Vienna, Austria
- Date of death: 1984 (aged 93–94)

Senior career*
Years	Team	Apps	(Gls)
- Athletic Club Sparta
1909–1911	Hakoah Wien		

Managerial career
- 1940: Mandatory Palestine
- * Club domestic league appearances and goals

Arthur Baar (German pronunciation: [ˈaʁtuːɐ̯ ˈbaːɐ̯]; Hebrew: ארתור בר; 1890–1984) was an Austrian-born football manager who served as vice-president of Hakoah Wien in Austria. After the annexation of Austria by Germany in 1938, Baar emigrated to Mandatory Palestine where he was instrumental in building football in the country, and was national team manager in the 1940 friendly against Lebanon.

== Early life ==
Baar was born in Vienna, Austria, to a Jewish family.
