= Jerard Ajemian =

Lebanese footballer

Personal information
- Position: Forward

Senior career*
Years	Team	Apps	(Gls)
1940–1942	Homenetmen Beirut		
1946	Pagramian		

International career
1940–1947	Lebanon	3	(0)
- * Club domestic league appearances and goals

Jerard Ajemian (Arabic: جيرار عجميان), also spelled Jarad, was a Lebanese footballer who played as a forward.

== Club career ==
Ajemian played for Homenetmen in 1940, and Pagramian in 1946.

== International career ==
Ajemian took part in Lebanon's first international match, in a friendly against Mandatory Palestine in 1940. In May 1946 he also represented Beirut XI, Beirut's select team, in a friendly game against Egyptian club Alexandria.
