= John Blackwell (referee) =

English soldier and football referee

- Born: England
- Other occupation: Soldier

International
Years	League	Role
1940	FIFA listed	Referee

John Blackwell was an English soldier and football referee. He officiated the 1940 friendly between Mandatory Palestine and Lebanon, which ended in a 5–1 victory to the home side. He was also part of the British Army in Palestine in 1940.
