= Joseph Nalbandian =

Lebanese football player and manager

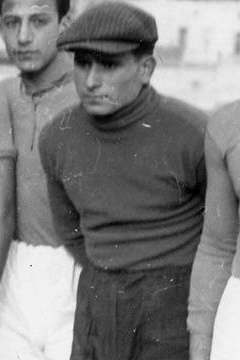
- Nalbandian with Beirut XI in 1937

Personal information
- Date of birth: 1919
- Position: Goalkeeper

Senior career*
Years	Team	Apps	(Gls)
1935	DPHB		
1936	Hilmi-Sport		
- Nahda
1939–1941	DPHB		
1942	Racing Beirut		
1943–1945	Sagesse		
1946	Homenetmen		

International career
1942	Lebanon	1	(0)

Managerial career
- 1947–1972: Homenetmen
- 1961–1967: Lebanon
- * Club domestic league appearances and goals

Joseph Nalbandian (Arabic: جوزف نلبنديان; 1919 – after 1985) was a Lebanese football player and manager.

During the 1930s and 1940s, Nalbandian played as a goalkeeper for DPHB, Hilmi-Sport, Sagesse, Homenetmen, and Nahda, at club level. He also represented Lebanon internationally.

Nalbandian coached Homenetmen, from 1947 to 1972, and Lebanon, during the 1960s. He was in the Regional Committee of Homenetmen between 1965 and 1971, and was General Secretary of the Lebanese Football Association between 1967 and 1985.

== Honours ==
=== Manager ===
Homenetmen Beirut

- Lebanese Premier League: 1947–48, 1950–51, 1954–55, 1962–63, 1968–69
- Lebanese FA Cup: 1947–48, 1961–62

Lebanon

- Arab Nations Cup third place: 1963
