= Tokyo Football Stadium =

Football stadium in Tokyo

- Location: Tokyo, Japan

Tokyo Football Stadium (東京蹴球場) is a football stadium in Tokyo, Japan.

It was used as football stadium of the 1958 Asian Games.
