= 1941–42 Palestine League =

Palestine League
- Season: 1941–42
- Champions: Maccabi Tel Aviv; 3rd title

The 1941–42 Palestine League was the ninth season of league football in the British Mandate for Palestine. The defending champions were Hapoel Tel Aviv.

The Palestine League was divided into three regional divisions (Haifa, Jerusalem, Southern) with playoffs at the end of the season, with the league winners and the Southern League runners-up qualifying for a championship playoff.

The Haifa League was cancelled on 5 March 1942 and a cup competition was played instead. Homenetmen Jerusalem won the Jerusalem League, and Maccabi Rishon LeZion won the Southern League. This meant that the two league winners, along with runner-up Maccabi Tel Aviv qualified to the championship playoff.

The championship playoff was won by Maccabi Tel Aviv.

== Southern League ==
Pos	Team	Pld	W	D	L	GF	GA	GR	Pts	Qualification or relegation
1	Maccabi Rishon LeZion	26	20	3	3	87	22	3.955	43	Championship Playoffs
2	Maccabi Tel Aviv	26	21	1	4	82	26	3.154	43	Championship Playoffs
3	Maccabi Nes Tziona	26	19	3	4	69	31	2.226	41	
4	Hapoel Tel Aviv	26	19	2	5	87	23	3.783	40	
5	Maccabi Petah Tikva	26	15	2	9	54	38	1.421	32	
6	Hapoel Petah Tikva	26	13	5	8	55	49	1.122	31	
7	Beitar Tel Aviv	26	11	4	11	50	48	1.042	25 (Note: Hapoel Rishon LeZion's matches against Beitar Tel Aviv and Degel Zion Tel Aviv were both given as 0–0 without points due to infringements from both involved clubs (in each match).)	
8	National Sport Club Jaffa	26	11	3	12	55	55	1.000	25	
9	Hapoel Ramat Gan	26	9	4	13	54	67	0.806	22	
10	Maccabi Rehovot	26	8	5	13	34	50	0.680	21	
11	Hapoel Herzliya	26	4	3	19	27	66	0.409	11	
12	Hapoel Rishon LeZion	26	5	2	19	26	71	0.366	10	
13	Hakoah Tel Aviv	26	4	1	21	27	95	0.284	9	
14	Degel Zion Tel Aviv	26	1	6	19	11	77	0.143	7	

Updated to match(es) played on 4 September 1943. Source: Memo no. 11, p. 3 IFA (in Hebrew)
Rules for classification: 1) points; 2) goal ratio.

== Jerusalem League ==
Homenetmen Jerusalem won the Jerusalem League. R.A.M.C. Jerusalem and Elitzur Jerusalem withdrew from the league.

Pos	Team	Pld	W	D	L	GF	GA	GR	Pts	Qualification or relegation
1	Homenetmen Jerusalem	14	10	3	1	38	10	3.800	23	
2	Maccabi Jerusalem	14	10	2	2	28	9	3.111	22	
3	Hapoel Jerusalem	14	8	3	3	28	12	2.333	19	
4	Degel Zion Jerusalem	14	5	5	4	15	16	0.938	14 (Note: The match between Degel Zion Jerusalem and Christian Club Jerusalem was given as a 0–0 without points, due to infringements on behalf of both teams.)	
5	Christian Club Jerusalem	14	5	2	7	19	23	0.826	11	
6	Hoyetchmen Club Jerusalem	14	4	2	8	21	36	0.583	10	
7	R.A.P.C.	14	3	1	10	11	30	0.367	7	
8	Araks Jerusalem	14	2	0	12	8	32	0.250	4	
9	R.A.M.C. (Note: The team representing the Royal Army Medical Corps withdrew from the competition and its results were annulled.)	14	3	7	4	1	6	0.167	13	Withdrew
10	Elitzur Jerusalem (Note: Elitzur Jerusalem withdrew from the competition and its results were annulled.)	14	14	0	0	10	1	10.000	28	Withdrew

Updated to match(es) played on 4 September 1943. Source: Memo no. 11, p. 3 IFA (in Hebrew)
Rules for classification: 1) points; 2) goal ratio.

== Championship play-off ==
At the conclusion of the regional leagues a championship play-off was held, with the two league winners and Maccabi Tel Aviv, runner-up of the Southern League. The matches between Maccabi Tel Aviv and Maccabi Rishon LeZion were held first, with Maccabi Tel Aviv winning the matches 2–0 and 5–0. Next, Maccabi Rishon LeZion and Homenetmen Jerusalem drew their match 3–3, but later Homenetmen chose to forfeit their matches against Maccabi Tel Aviv, after which Homenetmen were ejected from the play-offs and Maccabi Tel Aviv was declared winner.

=== Table ===
Pos	Team	Pld	W	D	L	GF	GA	GR	Pts	Qualification or relegation	MTA	MRL	HOM
1	Maccabi Tel Aviv	4	4	0	0	13	0	—	8	Champions	—	5–0	3–0
2	Maccabi Rishon LeZion	4	1	1	2	6	10	0.600	3		0–2	—	3–0
3	Homenetmen Jerusalem	4	0	1	3	3	12	0.250	1		0–3	3–3	—

Updated to match(es) played on 30 October 1943. Source: League and Cup Committee Meeting 1.11.43 Israeli Football Association (in Hebrew)
Rules for classification: 1) points; 2) goal ratio.
