= Werner Kaspi =

Israeli footballer (1917–1987)

Werner Kaspi ורנר כספי
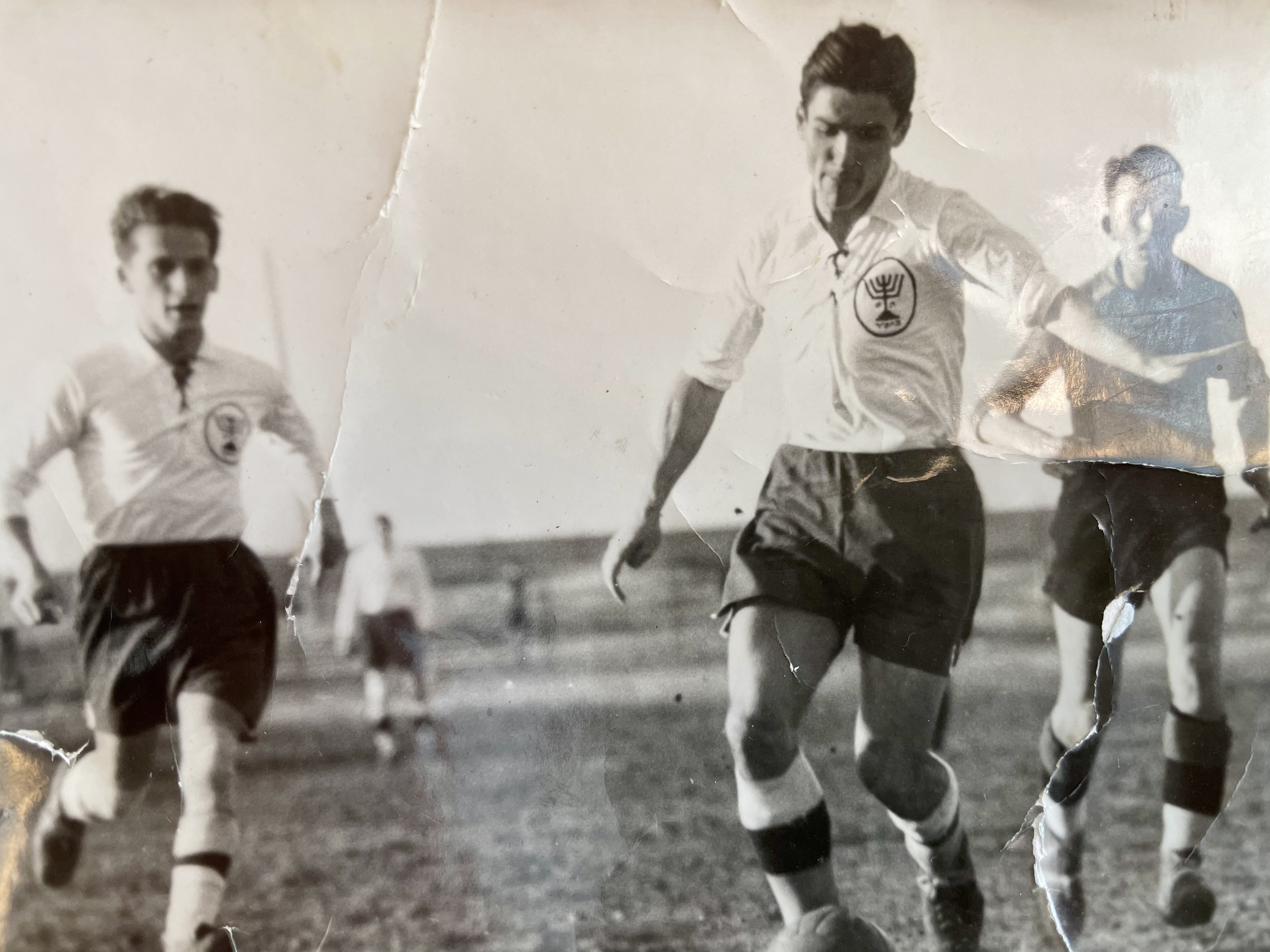

Personal information
- Full name: Werner Paul Kaspi
- Date of birth: 12 July 1917
- Date of death: 3 August 1987
- Position: Forward

Senior career*
Years	Team	Apps	(Gls)
1938	DFC Prag		
1939	Degel Zion Tel Aviv	1	(1)
1939	Hapoel Herzliya	1	(3)
1939–1940	Beitar Tel Aviv		
1943	Maccabi Netanya		

International career
1940	Mandatory Palestine	1	(2)
- * Club domestic league appearances and goals

Werner Paul Kaspi (né Silbermann; Hebrew: ורנר פאול כספי; 12 July 1917 - 3 August 1987) was an Israeli footballer who played as a forward for Beitar Tel Aviv and Maccabi Netanya at club level, and the Mandatory Palestine national team internationally. He is believed to have survived the Holocaust and oppression of the Nazi Germany regime, becoming a youth football coach in Tel Aviv.

Kaspi captained Mandatory Palestine in their last international match against Lebanon in 1940, scoring two goals; it was his only international cap.
