= Avraham Schneiderovitz =

Israeli footballer (1916–2001)

Avraham Schneiderovitz 'אברהם שניידרוביץ
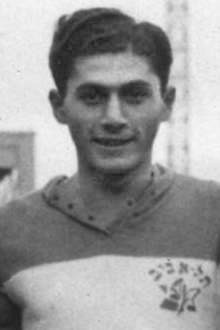
- Schneiderovitz with Maccabi Tel Aviv in 1939

Personal information
- Full name: Avraham Shani Schneiderovitz
- Date of birth: 1 December 1916
- Date of death: 25 June 2001 (aged 84)
- Position: Forward

Senior career*
Years	Team	Apps	(Gls)
1939–1940	Maccabi Nes Tziona		
1940	Maccabi Tel Aviv	1	(1)

International career
1940	Mandatory Palestine	1	(1)
- * Club domestic league appearances and goals

Avraham Shani Schneiderovitz (Hebrew: אברהם שניידרוביץ'; 1 December 1916 – 25 June 2001) was an Israeli footballer who played as a forward for Maccabi Tel Aviv and Maccabi Nes Tziona at club level, and the Mandatory Palestine national team internationally.

Schneiderovitz took part in Mandatory Palestine's last international match against Lebanon in 1940, scoring one goal; it was his only international cap.
