= Herbert Meitner =

Israeli footballer (1913–??)

Herbert Meitner הרברט מייטנר
Personal information
- Date of birth: 1913
- Position: Forward

Senior career*
Years	Team	Apps	(Gls)
1939	Hapoel Tel Aviv		
1940–1941	Hapoel Rishon LeZion		
1943–1944	Hapoel Tel Aviv		

International career
1940	Mandatory Palestine	1	(1)
- * Club domestic league appearances and goals

Herbert Meitner (Hebrew: הרברט מייטנר; born 1913) was an Israeli footballer who played as a forward for Hapoel Tel Aviv and Hapoel Rishon at club level, and the Mandatory Palestine national team internationally.

Meitner took part in Mandatory Palestine's last international match against Lebanon in 1940, scoring one goal; it was his only international cap.
