= Gaul Machlis =

Israeli football player and manager

Gaul Machlis גאול מכליס
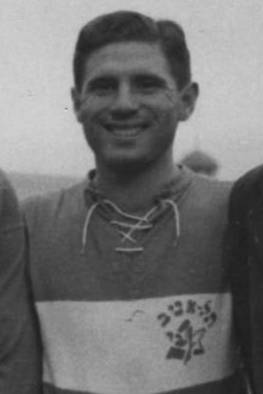
- Machlis with Maccabi Tel Aviv in 1939

Personal information
- Date of birth: 21 May 1918
- Place of birth: Petah Tikva, Palestine, OETA South
- Date of death: 19 February 1995 (aged 76)
- Positions: Forward; attacking midfielder

Youth career
- Maccabi Petah Tikva

Senior career*
Years	Team	Apps	(Gls)
1934–1936	Maccabi Petah Tikva		
1936–1947	Maccabi Tel Aviv	35	(29)

International career
1940	Mandatory Palestine	3	(1)

Managerial career
- 1952: Maccabi Petah Tikva
- 1952–1953: Maccabi Tel Aviv
- * Club domestic league appearances and goals

Gaul Machlis (Hebrew: גאול מכליס; 21 May 1918 – 19 February 1995) was an Israeli football player and manager. As a player, he played as a forward or attacking midfielder for Maccabi Petah Tikva and Maccabi Tel Aviv at club level, and for Mandatory Palestine internationally.

== Club career ==
Born in Petah Tikva, Palestine, on 21 May 1918, Machlis began his senior club career at hometown club Maccabi Petah Tikva in 1934, where he won multiple titles, before moving Maccabi Tel Aviv in 1936. In 1945, Machlis was forced to retire early from his playing career due to injury.

== Managerial career ==
Following his retirement as a player, Machlis was appointed manager of Maccabi Petah Tikva at the end of the 1951–52 season. Before the end of the season, he became manager of Maccabi Tel Aviv, replacing Jerry Beit haLevi. He was dismissed in the middle of the following season.

== International career ==
Machlis represented Mandatory Palestine internationally three times between 1938 and 1940. He scored one goal in his last cap, in Mandatory Palestine's last international match against Lebanon in 1940.

== Personal life ==
Machlis died on 19 February 1995 before the age of 77, after suffering from a serious illness.
