= AS Hilmi-Sport =

Defunct Lebanese football club

Hilmi-Sport
- Full name: Association Sportive Hilmi-Sport
- Nicknames: الشياطين الحمر; Les Diables Rouges (The Red Devils)
- Founded: 1936; 89 years ago
Home colours

Association Sportive Hilmi-Sport (Arabic: حلمي سبور) was a football club based in Beirut, Lebanon. Established in 1936, they won two Lebanese FA Cups in 1939 and 1940, and were finalists in the inaugural Lebanese FA Cup in 1938.

== History ==
Hilmi-Sport was founded in 1936 by Khalil Hilmi, with Imre Zinger from Hungary appointed as the first coach. The club was known as "the Red Devils" (Arabic: الشياطين الحمر; French: Les Diables Rouges), and wore a red shirt with black shorts. Hilmi-Sport hosted several foreign teams, most notably Austrian clubs First Vienna and Admira Vienna, and Romanian club CFR Cluj, among others.

In 1937–38 Hilmi-Sport won the Lebanese Second Division, and were runners up in the Lebanese FA Cup. They won the FA Cup twice in a row: in 1938–39 and 1939–40. Two players from Hilmi-Sport took part in Lebanon's first official international match in 1940, against Mandatory Palestine: Muhieddine Jaroudi and club captain Salah Falah.

== Honours ==
- Lebanese FA Cup
  - Winners (2): 1938–39, 1939–40
  - Runners-up (1): 1937–38
- Lebanese Second Division
  - Winners (1): 1937–38

== Bibliography ==
- Sakr, Ali Hamidi (1992). موسوعة كرة القدم اللبنانية 1991–1992 [1991–1992 Lebanese Football Encyclopedia] (PDF) (in Arabic). مؤسسة نوفل للتوزيع. ISBN 0000281247.
