= Degel Zion Tel Aviv F.C. =

Israeli football club

Degel Zion Tel Aviv
- Full name: Degel Zion Tel Aviv Football Club דגל ציון תל אביב
- Founded: 1933
- Dissolved: 1955
- 1954–55: Liga Gimel Middle, 7th

Degel Zion Tel Aviv (Hebrew: דגל ציון תל אביב) was an Israeli football club based in the Florentin neighborhood of Tel Aviv. The club spent one season in the top division prior to the Israeli Declaration of Independence.

== History ==
The club was founded in 1933 in the Florentin neighborhood of Tel Aviv by Jews which immigrated to Mandatory Palestine from Greece and Turkey. In 1940, the club won the Samaria division of Liga Bet, the second-tier league of the Palestine League at the time, and was set to compete in promotion play-offs against the other regional winners, Hapoel Hadera and Hapoel Rishon LeZion. However, due to disagreement between Hapoel and Maccabi factions, there were no league games in the 1940–41 season, and after an agreement was reached, Degel Zion were placed in the Palestine League for the 1941–42 season, where they finished at the bottom of the Southern division, in their only season playing at the top division.

In the Palestine Cup, the club have reached the Semi-finals in 1941, where they lost 0–2 to Hapoel Tel Aviv.

After the Israeli Declaration of Independence, the club played in Liga Meuhedet, the temporary second tier in the 1949–50 season, where they finished seventh out of nine in the Tel Aviv division and relegated to Liga Gimel, the third tier of Israeli football at the time. The club folded after the 1954–55 season, in which they finished seventh in the Middle division.

== Honours ==
=== League ===
Honour	No.	Years
Second tier	1	1940
