= Palestine League =

- Founded: 1928
- Folded: 1948 (replaced by Liga Alef)
- Region: Mandatory Palestine
- Level on pyramid: 1
- Domestic cup: People's Cup
- Last champions: Maccabi Tel Aviv (Four titles)
- Most championships: Hapoel Tel Aviv (Five titles)

The Palestine League (Arabic: دوري فلسطين, romanized: Dawriyy Filasṭīn), also known as The Eretz Israel League (Hebrew: ליגת ארץ ישראל בכדורגל, romanized: Ligat Eretz Israel B'Kaduregel), was an association football league during the British Mandate of Palestine (now Israel, West Bank and Gaza Strip), which was contested from 1928 to 1948. It was organised by the Eretz Israel Football Association, and is therefore regarded as the original incarnation of the modern Israeli top flight league, which has existed since 1948.

== Organisation and history ==
Organised by the Eretz Israel Football Association, later to become the Israel Football Association, it is regarded as a predecessor of the modern Israeli Premier League, as well as a former part of the Israeli football league system. Because of violent conflicts involving the Yishuv, its scheduling was inconsistent and in some seasons no national championship was held.

Football clubs in Mandate Palestine were strictly segregated on ethnoreligious grounds, with separate Jewish and Palestinian Arab clubs. The only teams which were somewhat mixed were those representing the Palestine Police Force and the Civil Service; mostly containing Britons, but with some Jewish and Arab players.

The league was suspended for two seasons after 1947 amidst the termination of the British Mandate over the country in May 1948, the independence of the State of Israel at the same time, and the subsequent war between Israel and several surrounding countries. The Palestine League was formally superseded in 1949 by the new Israeli League, Liga Alef.

The Palestine League was first won by a team representing the British Police force, who finished the season unbeaten. They also won the People's Cup that season, in doing so winning the double. Except for Jerusalem-based British Police's initial victory, only Jewish clubs from Tel Aviv won the title during the Mandate period; Hapoel and Maccabi Tel Aviv won five and four championships respectively. (Note: Because of the inconsistent league programme during the 1930s and 1940s, controversy remains concerning the number of titles won by Hapoel Tel Aviv during that period. The 1934–35 championship was abandoned with Hapoel Tel Aviv leading the standings; at the time it went unawarded but the Israel Football Association today recognises the title. The 1937–38 league season was also abandoned long before its end because of the Arab revolt in Palestine, once more with Hapoel Tel Aviv top of the table. As with the unfinished 1934–35 title, the Israel Football Association today lists the club as having won the 1937–38 crown. Counting both of these titles, Hapoel have five Palestine League championships and 13 in total, but FIFA and UEFA only credit the club with four pre-1948 titles, giving an overall total of 12. The club itself claims to have won 13 titles, five before independence and eight afterwards. This figure is corroborated by the Israel Football Association and Ynet.)

== Seasons ==
Key

^{†}	Champions also won the People's Cup during the same season
(number of titles)	A running tally of the total number of championships won by each club is kept in brackets.

Full league standings and top scorer details not known at this time.

Season	Winner (number of titles)	Notes
1928	Maccabi Hasmonean Jerusalem (1)	–
1931–32	British Police (1)^{†}	–
1932–33	Not held	–
1933–34	Hapoel Tel Aviv (1)^{†}	–
1934–35	Hapoel Tel Aviv (2)	
1935–36	Maccabi Tel Aviv (1)	–
1936–37	Maccabi Tel Aviv (2)	–
1937–38	Hapoel Tel Aviv (3)^{†}	
1938–39	No national championship	(Note: No national championship was held; instead regional leagues took place in each district. Maccabi Tel Aviv won the Tel Aviv district league and British Police won in Jerusalem, but the champions of Haifa are not known.)
1939–40	Hapoel Tel Aviv (4)	–
1940–41	Not held	–
1941–42	Maccabi Tel Aviv (3)	–
1942–43	Not finished	(Note: During 1942–43, three regional leagues were held in Tel Aviv, Jerusalem and Haifa; the regional champions were supposed to enter a three-way mini-league for the national title, but when the Haifa league was abandoned the national championship was reduced to a single match between the champions of Tel Aviv and Jerusalem. The champions of Jerusalem, Homenetmen, refused to play against Maccabi Tel Aviv, leading Maccabi to be declared national champions by default. Today the title is neither claimed by Maccabi Tel Aviv nor recognised by the Israel Football Association.)
1943–44	Hapoel Tel Aviv (5)	–
1944–45	No national championship	(Note: Two regional leagues were held instead of a national championship. Beitar Tel Aviv finished top of the Southern District league while Hapoel Tel Aviv won in the Northern District.)
1945–46	Not held	–
1946–47	Maccabi Tel Aviv (4)^{†}	–
1947–48	Not finished	–
1948–49	Not held	–

Winner	Titles	Years won
Hapoel Tel Aviv	5	1934, 1935, 1938, 1940, 1944
Maccabi Tel Aviv	4	1936, 1937, 1942, 1947
Maccabi Hasmonean Jerusalem	1	1928
British Police	1	1931
Nordia (Beitar) Tel Aviv	1	1948

== See also ==
- Football in Israel
- Football in Palestine
- Liga Alef
- Ligat Ha'al
