= Maccabi Rishon LeZion F.C. =

Maccabi Rishon LeZion
- Full name: Maccabi Rishon LeZion Football Club
- Founded: 1912
- Dissolved: 1953
- 1951–52: Liga Alef, 12th (Relegated)

Maccabi Rishon LeZion (Hebrew: מכבי ראשון לציון) was an Israeli football club based in Rishon LeZion. The club spent six seasons in the top division, before and after the Israeli Declaration of Independence and was part of the wider Maccabi Rishon LeZion sports club which still exists today.

== History ==
Maccabi Rishon LeZion was founded in 1912. During the British Mandate, the club reached the top division for the first time in the 1941–42 season, where they finished at the top of the South division, but lost the championship play-offs, which was played against Jerusalem division champions Homenetmen Jerusalem and South division runners-up Maccabi Tel Aviv. The club took part in the first post-independence league during 1949–50, finishing second from bottom with just eight points and conceding 117 goals (the second highest to date, excluding the double season of 1966–68), twice conceding more than ten goals; they lost 10–1 at Hapoel Ramat Gan and 13–0 at home to champions Maccabi Tel Aviv, a result that remains the largest defeat in the top division.

The following season (1951–52), they finished bottom with just four points and another 100 goals conceded, and were relegated to Liga Bet alongside city rivals Hapoel.

The club folded during the 1953–54 season.
