= Maccabiah Stadium =

Former football stadium in Tel Aviv, Israel

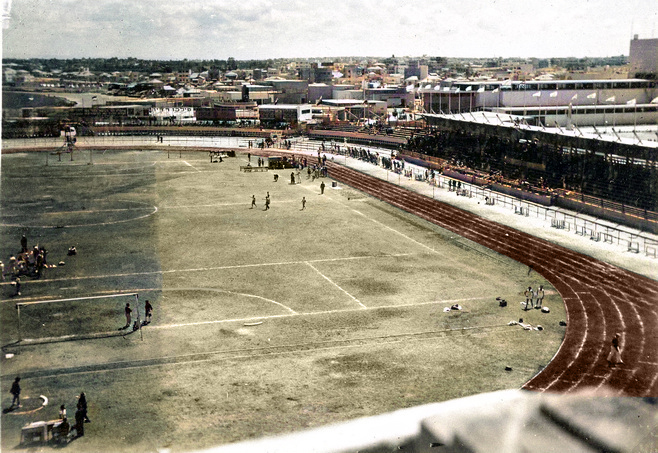
- Maccabiah Stadium in 1935
- Interactive map of Maccabiah Stadium
- Location: Tel Aviv, Israel
- Coordinates: 32°6′01″N 34°46′35″E
- Capacity: 5,000 (original 20,000)

Construction
- Opened: 28 March 1932
- Closed: ~1960s
- Cost: £P3,000

Tenants
- Maccabi Tel Aviv (1938–1969); Hapoel Tel Aviv (1961–1962); Israel national football team (1949–1950): Major sporting events hosted; 1932 Maccabiah Games; 1935 Maccabiah Games

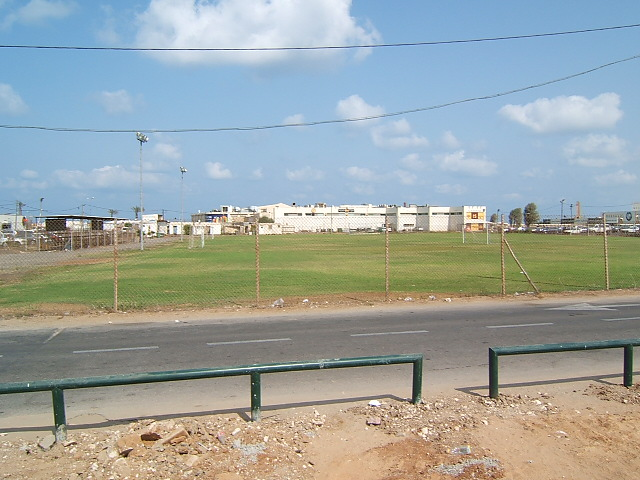
The Maccabiah Stadium in 2007

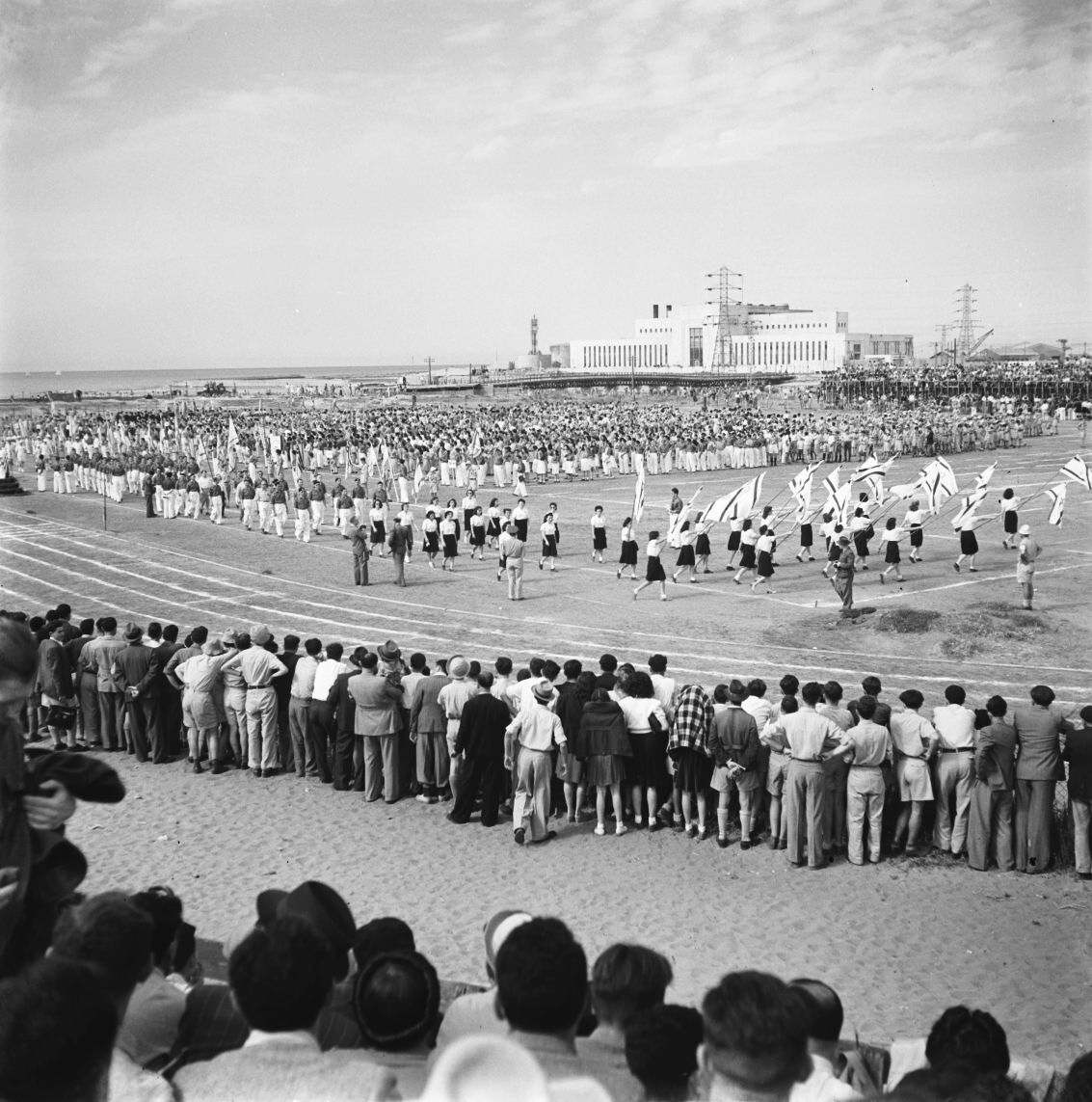
The Maccabiah Stadium in 1946

The Maccabiah Stadium (Hebrew: אצטדיון המכביה Itztadion HaMakabiya) was a football stadium on the Yarkon River in Tel Aviv, Israel.

Maccabiah Stadium was built in 1932 for the first Maccabiah Games and was filled to capacity for the opening ceremony. It was used by Maccabi Tel Aviv until 1969, when the team moved to the Bloomfield Stadium.

== See also ==
- Levant Fair
- Sports in Israel
