= Maccabi Nes Tziona F.C. =

Maccabi Nes Tziona (Hebrew: מכבי נס ציונה) was an Israeli football club based in Nes Tziona.

== History ==
The club was founded in 1912. In 1923 the club won the Magen Shimshon, a cup for Maccabi-affiliated teams, and won it again the following season. During the 1930s they played in the Palestine League.

After Israeli independence the club were placed in the Israeli League, but lost all 24 matches that season scoring only seven goals, and were subsequently relegated (although second-from-bottom Maccabi Rishon LeZion actually had the league's worst goal difference). The club's record of zero points remains a record low.

At the end of the following season, 1951–52, the club finished second bottom of the South Division of Liga Bet and were relegated again.

The club folded in 1955, as the local football clubs of Nes Tziona merged, and Sektziyat Kaduregel Nes Tziona was founded.
