= 1933–34 in Mandatory Palestine football =

Football in Mandatory Palestine
- Season: 1933–34

The 1933–34 season was the seventh season of competitive football in the British Mandate for Palestine under the Eretz Israel Football Association and the 2nd under the Arab Palestine Sports Federation.

== IFA Competitions ==
=== 1933–34 Palestine League ===
Due to orders of the High Commissioner for Palestine, the second edition of the Palestine League was played without participation of British teams, including the reigning champions, British Police. Hapoel Tel Aviv won the title after completing a perfect season of 14 victories in 14 matches.

| Pos | Team | Pld | W | D | L | GF | GA | GR | Pts |
|---|---|---|---|---|---|---|---|---|---|
| 1 | Hapoel Tel Aviv (C) | 14 | 14 | 0 | 0 | 45 | 7 | 6.429 | 28 |
| 2 | Maccabi Hashmonai | 13 | 7 | 2 | 4 | 27 | 17 | 1.588 | 16 |
| 3 | Hapoel Haifa | 11 | 5 | 4 | 2 | 25 | 18 | 1.389 | 14 |
| 4 | Maccabi Petah Tikva | 11 | 5 | 2 | 4 | 13 | 15 | 0.867 | 12 |
| 5 | Maccabi Tel Aviv | 12 | 4 | 3 | 5 | 25 | 20 | 1.250 | 11 |
| 6 | Maccabi Nes Tziona | 13 | 4 | 2 | 7 | 10 | 24 | 0.417 | 10 |
| 7 | Maccabi Rehovot | 13 | 2 | 2 | 9 | 11 | 30 | 0.367 | 6 |
| 8 | Hapoel Jerusalem | 13 | 0 | 3 | 10 | 10 | 35 | 0.286 | 3 |
| 9 | Maccabi Haifa (Note: Maccabi Haifa withdrew from the league after playing two matches due to travel costs.) (F) | 0 | 0 | 0 | 0 | 0 | 0 | — | 0 |

Updated to match(es) played on 14 July 1934. Source: IFA, Do'ar HaYom
(C) Champions; (F) Folded

=== 1934 Palestine Cup ===
10 clubs entered the competition, which ended, as the previous competition, with a Tel Aviv derby. This time Hapoel defeated Maccabi 3–2 and won the cup.

=== Final ===
2 June 1934

| Hapoel Tel Aviv | 3–2 | Maccabi Tel Aviv |
|---|---|---|
| Harlap 12'; Berger (pen.); Zimon | | 2' Neufeld; Beit haLevi |

Maccabi Avshalem Petah Tikva ground
Referee: Adler

== National team ==
=== 1934 World Cup Qualification ===
The EIFA entered a team to the 1934 World Cup, and was placed in Group 12 of the qualification rounds, with Egypt and Turkey. Following Turkey's withdrawal, the national team faced Egypt in a two-legged tie. Prior to the first match the national team played three practice matches, the first against a Royal Air Force Palestine XI, which was won 7–2, the second against a British military team from Gaza, which was won 3–1, and the second against a Royal Air Force Middle East XI, which was won 8–1.

| 16 March 1934 1934 WCQ | Egypt | 7–1 | Mandatory Palestine | Cairo, Egypt |
| | Mokhtar 11', 35', 51'; Taha 21', 79'; Latif 43', 87' | Report; Report | Nudelman 61' | Stadium: British Army Ground; Attendance: 13,000; Referee: Stanley Wells (England) |

| 6 April 1934 1934 WCQ | Mandatory Palestine | 1–4 | Egypt | Tel Aviv, Mandatory Palestine |
| | Sukenik 54' | Report; Report | Latif 2'; Mokhtar 7', 22'; Fawzi 35' | Stadium: Hapoel Ground; Attendance: 5,000 / 8,000; Referee: Frederick John Goodsby (England) |

Egypt qualified for the final round.

==== Line-ups ====
Coaches: (Israel) (Austria) Egon Pollak, (Israel) (Poland) Shimon Ratner

16/03/1934:
GK: Willy Berger (Hap. Tel Aviv)
DF: Avraham Reznik (Mac. Tel Aviv), Pinhas Fiedler (Mac. Hasmonean)
MF: Zalman Friedman (Hap. Tel Aviv), Gedalyahu Fuchs (Hap. Haifa), Yohanan Sukenik (Hap. Tel Aviv)
FW: Amnon Harlap (Hap. Tel Aviv), Ferenc Kraus (Hap. Tel Aviv), Paul Kastenbaum (Hap. Tel Aviv), Haim Reich, Avraham Nudelman (Hap. Tel Aviv)

06/04/1934:
GK: Willy Berger (Hap. Tel Aviv)
DF: David Weinberg (Mac. Tel Aviv), Pinhas Fiedler (Mac. Hasmonean)
MF: Zalman Friedman (Hap. Tel Aviv), Gedalyahu Fuchs (Hap. Haifa), Yohanan Sukenik (Hap. Tel Aviv)
FW: Amnon Harlap (Hap. Tel Aviv), Ya'akov Levi-Meir (Hap. Tel Aviv), Ya'akov Zelivanski (Mac. Tel Aviv), Haim Reich, Avraham Nudelman (Hap. Tel Aviv)
