= Shlomo Poliakov =

Israeli footballer (1912–1965)

Shlomo Poliakov שלמה פוליאקוב
Personal information
- Date of birth: 1912
- Place of birth: Russia
- Date of death: 19 September 1965 (aged 52–53)
- Place of death: Israel
- Position: Right winger

Youth career
- 1925: HaGibor Tel Aviv
- 1925–1927: Allenby Tel Aviv

Senior career*
Years	Team	Apps	(Gls)
1927–1941	Hapoel Tel Aviv		
1944–1945	Hapoel Petah Tikva	3	(2)

Managerial career
- Hapoel Petah Tikva
- 1947–1950: Hapoel Ramat Gan
- Hapoel Haifa
- Hapoel Holon
- * Club domestic league appearances and goals

Shlomo Poliakov (Hebrew: שלמה פוליאקוב) was a Russian-born Israeli footballer who played as a right winger for Hapoel Tel Aviv and Hapoel Petah Tikva and later worked as a manager for several Hapoel clubs and for Hapoel Tel Aviv's youth team.

== Playing career ==
Poliakov was born in Russian Empire in 1912, and immigrated to Palestine in 1922 with his Family. At the age of 13, Poliakov started playing football with local youth club Allenby Tel Aviv, which was initially affiliated with Maccabi Tel Aviv, but its members decided to withdraw from Maccabi, due to the professional attitude towards sports and merged in 1927 with Hapoel Tel Aviv. With Hapoel, Poliakov stayed until 1941, and won 4 championships and 5 cups, scoring goals in the 1937 and 1938 cup finals. In 1944–45 Poliakov played with Hapoel Petah Tikva, leading the club to the cup final, which the team lost to Hapoel Tel Aviv.

Poliakov was a squad member of the Mandatory Palestine national team, but was not selected to play in any of the national team's five matches before the establishment of Israel, playing in preparation and exhibitions matches only.

== Managerial career ==
After retirement, Poliakov managed the senior teams of Hapoel Petah Tikva, Hapoel Ramat Gan, Hapoel Haifa and Hapoel Holon as well as Hapoel Tel Aviv youth team.

== Personal life ==
Poliakov married Miriam Nudelman, sister of his teammate Avraham Nudelman, in 1939. His son, Yisrael Poliakov (1941–2007) was an actor and comedian, and part of the HaGashash HaHiver comedy group.

== Honours ==
Hapoel Tel Aviv

- Palestine League: 1933–34, 1934–35, 1937–38, 1939–40
- Palestine Cup: 1928, 1934, 1937, 1938, 1939
