= Yohanan Sukenik =

Israeli association football player (1909–1986)

Yohanan Sukenik יוחנן סוקניק
Personal information
- Full name: Yohanan Sukenik
- Date of birth: 1909
- Place of birth: Łódź, Russian Poland
- Date of death: 18 January 1986 (aged 75–76)
- Place of death: Israel
- Position: Half back

Youth career
- 1923–1927: Nordia Tel Aviv

Senior career*
Years	Team	Apps	(Gls)
1927–1940	Hapoel Tel Aviv		

International career
1934–1938	Eretz Israel	4	(1)

Managerial career
- 1945: Hapoel Ramat Gan
- * Club domestic league appearances and goals

Yohanan Sukenik (Hebrew: יוחנן סוקניק) was a Jewish footballer, who played for Hapoel Tel Aviv and Mandatory Palestine national football team.

== Biography ==
Sukenik was born in Łódź, then part of the Russian Empire and immigrated to Mandatory Palestine with his family in 1923. A keen footballer, he joined Maccabi Tel Aviv's youth team, Nordia. In 1927 he moved to Hapoel Tel Aviv, with whom he played until retiring in 1940. With the Hapoel Tel Aviv, Sukenik won 4 championships and 5 cups.

Sukenik was also part of the Mandatory Palestine national football team, playing four matches for the team, two against Egypt in 1934, scoring the consolation goal for Mandatory Palestine in a 1–4 defeat, and two against Greece in 1938, including appearing as a substitute the first match between the teams.

Sukenik retired in 1940, as he felt that playing football was damaging his feet and settled in Ramat Gan, where he worked as a builder. He tried his hand in coaching Hapoel Ramat Gan, but quit the position as he considered his players weren't making the effort to train properly and quit football altogether.

== Honours ==
- League Championships (4):
  - 1933–34, 1934–35, 1937–38, 1940
- Cup (5):
  - 1928, 1934, 1937, 1938, 1939
