= Avraham Nudelman =

Israeli footballer

Avraham Nudelman אברהם נודלמן
Personal information
- Full name: Avraham "Nucha" Nudelman
- Date of birth: 5 October 1910
- Place of birth: Jaffa, Ottoman Palestine
- Date of death: 1 February 1985 (aged 74)
- Place of death: Israel
- Position: Left wing

Youth career
- 1924–1925: Nordia Tel Aviv
- 1925: HaGibor Tel Aviv
- 1925–1927: Allenby Tel Aviv

Senior career*
Years	Team	Apps	(Gls)
1927–1938	Hapoel Tel Aviv		

International career
1934–1938	Eretz Israel	3	(1)

Managerial career
- Hapoel Kiryat Shalom
- Maccabi Bat Yam
- Hapoel Ramat Gan
- * Club domestic league appearances and goals

Avraham Nudelman (Hebrew: אברהם נודלמן) was an Israeli footballer who played for Hapoel Tel Aviv and Mandatory Palestine national football team during the British Mandate era.

== Playing career ==
Nudelman was born in Menashiya neighborhood of Jaffa in 1910, and started playing football with local youth club Allenby Tel Aviv, which was initially affiliated with Maccabi Tel Aviv, but its members decided to withdraw from Maccabi, due to the professional attitude towards sports and merged in 1927 with Hapoel Tel Aviv. With Hapoel, Nudelman stayed until 1938, when he retired from football in favor of his day job as a worker in Tel Aviv Harbor. Nudelman won 3 championships and 4 cups, scoring goals in the 1928 and 1938 cup finals. Nudelman was also part of the Mandatory Palestine national football team, and played three matches for the team, two against Egypt in 1934, scoring the consolation goal for Mandatory Palestine in a 1–7 defeat, and one against Greece in 1938, after which he retired from the national team.

== Personal life ==
During World War II, Nudelman enlisted in the British Army, where he served as a driver. After the 1948 Arab–Israeli War, Nudelman was given a work as a chauffeur in the Ministry of Defense and played for the ministry's football team.

== Honours ==
- League Championships (3):
  - 1933–34, 1934–35, 1937–38
- Cup (4):
  - 1928, 1934, 1937, 1938
