= Mila Ginzburg =

Israeli footballer

Mila Ginzburg Шлёмо Гинзбург
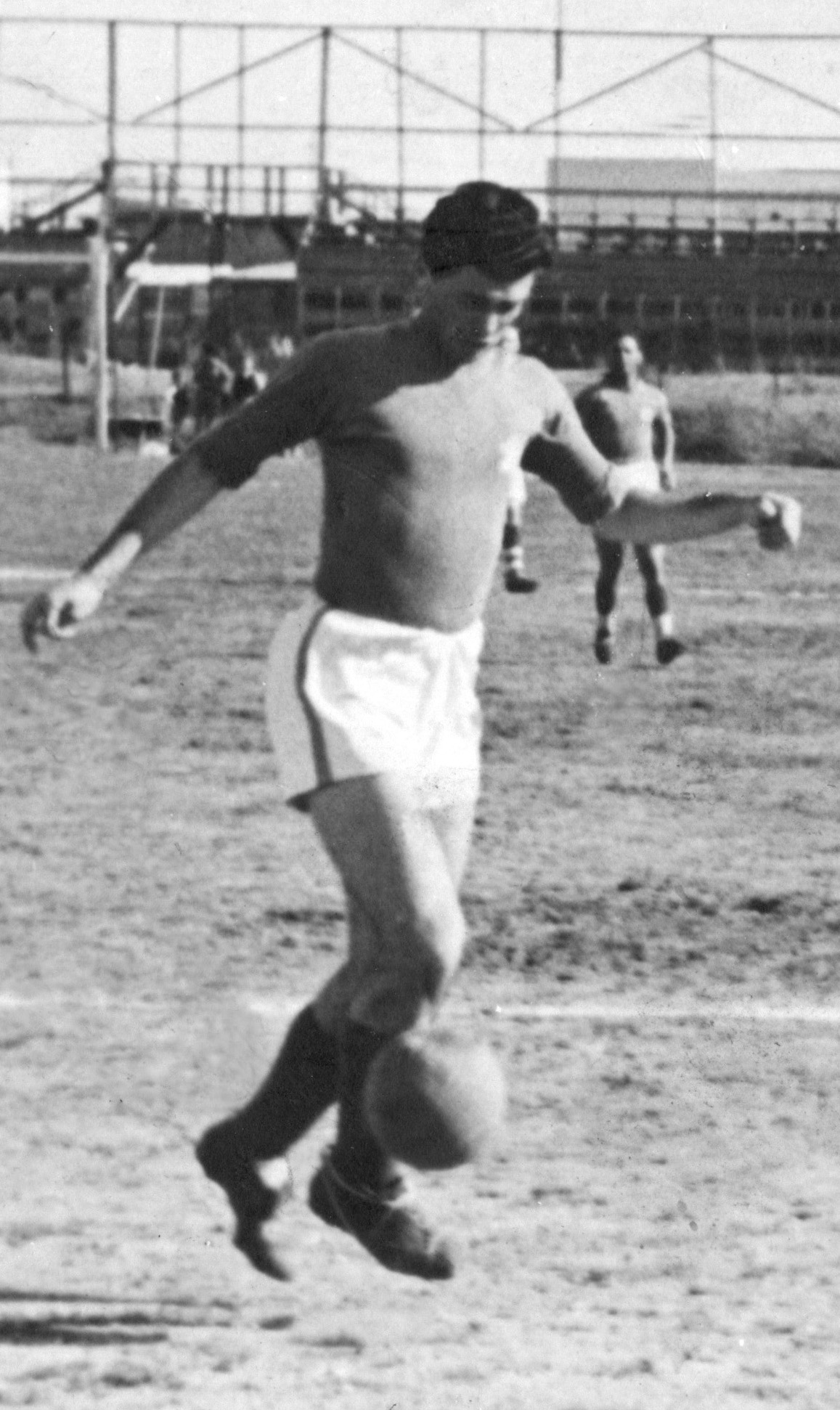

Personal information
- Birth name: Shmuel Ginzburg
- Date of birth: 2 November 1918
- Place of birth: Ukraine
- Date of death: 17 May 1990 (aged 71)
- Height: 1.75 m (5 ft 9 in)
- Position: Left winger

Youth career
- 1935–1936: Maccabi "Shimon" Tel Aviv

Senior career*
Years	Team	Apps	(Gls)
1936–1943	Maccabi Tel Aviv		

International career^{‡}
1938	Mandatory Palestine	1	(0)
- * Club domestic league appearances and goals as of 20 May 2019 ‡ National team caps and goals as of 20 May 2019

Shmuel "Mila" Ginzburg (Russian: Шлёмо Гинзбург; 2 November 1918 – 17 May 1990) was an Israeli footballer who played as a left winger for Maccabi Tel Aviv and the Mandatory Palestine national team.

== Early life ==
Shmuel Ginzburg, who was known as "Mila", was born in the Ukrainian People's Republic. His brother Baruch was murdered at the age of 18 at the family home during the Petliura riots in 1918. After Baruch's death, his eldest brother Yosef immigrated to Land of Israel. Mila immigrated at the age of four, with his parents and other brothers leaving Kiev, Ukrainian SSR. Only his sister Masha stayed in Ukraine and her son became a pilot in the Russian army. Among the family members was Baron Ginsburg, who in the 19th century was one of the four richest Jews in the world. At the age of 10 Mila Ginzburg attended the Ahad Ha'am elementary school, and at the age of 15 he was included in the youth team of the southern district, which included players from Maccabi Rehovot, Maccabi Nes Ziona, Maccabi Rishon LeZion and Gedera.

== Club career ==
(1935) with the Maccabee youth team and joined Maccabi Shimon in the name of the late soccer player Shimon Tabak in 1935. When Maccabi Tel Aviv returned from its successful trip in the United States (1936), a word was raised for Maccabi Tel Aviv's senior team. Early in his first match against Maccabi Petah Tikva he appeared as a left-wing defender, but thanks to his strong and deliberate kicks, the coach brought him to the line His first international game was against the strong Romanian team Timoswara, Maccabi lost 3–4, Mila scored one goal, and the same year he won the league championship with Perry Neufeld, Jerry Beit haLevi, Menachem Marimovich, and even managed to play with his younger brother Yosef Merimovich.

On 13 February 1937, Maccabi Tel Aviv played against Maccabi Jerusalem in the 1937 Palestine Cup. Thousands of spectators arrived in Jerusalem. In the opening kick, Deputy Mayor David Auster honored Maccabi Tel Aviv, defeating the Jerusalem team with 10 goals (10-0), Ginzburg scored hattrick.

Ginzburg participated in Maccabi Tel Aviv's game tour to Australia in 1939, when the team was also strengthened with four players from different teams in the league. Ukrainian also remembered the opening of the goal (2-1) in favor of his team against the Australian national football team, in front of 45,000 spectators.

== International career ==
Ginzburg made one appearance in the national team game against the national team in the 1938 FIFA World Cup qualification.

== Personal life ==
In 1941, Mila married Yardena, with whom he had two children, Talia and Avishai. When the family moved to Gedera, Mila Ginzburg had a hard time getting to the group's training and in 1943, when he was only 24, he retired from active play.
