= 1938 Liga Bet =

Liga Bet
- Season: 1938

The 1938 Liga Bet season was the second tier league of the Palestine League organized by the EIFA.

Six teams played in the South division and eight teams were assigned to the North division. However, as the Arab revolt intensified in fall 1938 and with the High commissioner issuing restrictive orders on travel throughout Palestine, the EIFA created a two-tiered league for the Tel Aviv region, with matches played in the league counting towards the national league. The Tel Aviv League was completed on 14 January 1939 and in February 1939 a new league season began, with teams playing in regionalized divisions instead a national league.

== North division ==
Eight teams played in the division:

- Hapoel Hadera
- Hapoel Kfar Ata
- Hapoel Kiryat Haim
- Hapoel Tiberias
- Maccabi Binyamina
- Maccabi Hadera
- Maccabi Haifa
- SC Atlit

== South division ==
Pos	Team	Pld	W	D	L	GF	GA	GR	Pts
1	Degel Zion Tel Aviv	5	3	2	0	13	8	1.625	8
2	Beitar Tel Aviv	5	3	1	1	23	9	2.556	7
3	Maccabi Gedera	5	3	0	2	8	9	0.889	6
4	HaKochav Tel Aviv	5	2	0	3	9	8	1.125	4
5	Maccabi Rehovot	5	1	1	3	11	16	0.688	3
6	Hapoel Rishon LeZion	5	1	0	4	4	18	0.222	2

Updated to match(es) played on 2 April 1938. Source: Protocol No. 38/11 IFA (in Hebrew)
Rules for classification: 1) points; 2) goal difference; 3) number of wins; 4) goals scored; 5) head to head; 6)deciding match.
