= History of the Israel national football team =

Israel's men's national football team has represented the country in international competitions since 1930. The team is governed by the Israel Football Association, the administrative body of Israeli football.

As of November 2010, the Israeli team has played in 436 official matches, recording 162 wins, 104 draws, and 170 losses. The team's last qualification for a major tournament—either the FIFA World Cup or European Championships—was in 1970 when the World Cup was held in Mexico. Israel also won the AFC Asian Cup in 1964, which was hosted in Israel.

Israel is the only team to have participated in three different regional football federations' competitions—Oceania, Asia and Europe. Although geographically part of Asia, political considerations have led to limited participation in Asian competitions. Since 1991, Israel has been a member of UEFA, the governing body for European football.

== Pre-State ==
In June 1928, Sir Alfred Mond visited Mandate Palestine. Mond was a professional footballer. During his visit, he announced his willingness to fund the establishment of a national squad of 18 players who would travel to games in England in order to play in the first league. While there had previously been a number of local teams fielded in exhibition games abroad, Mond was the first to propose the establishment of a national team. He met with the heads of "Maccabi" and "Hapoel", the dominant local sports organizations. Despite the hostilities that existed then between the organizations, it was decided to implement the proposal of Richmond to establish three committees that would be responsible for organizing a team.

A tournament was played between the major football clubs at the time: Hapoel Tel Aviv, Maccabi Tel Aviv, Hapoel Haifa and Maccabi Hashmonai Jerusalem. While Hapoel Tel Aviv won the tournament without a single loss, the committee included players from the other teams in the national team. Discipline problems also arose within the group, and the organizing committee feared serious discipline problems during the voyage to England. Local criticism and criticism between the two sports unions led to a request from Sir Mond to send a professional coach from England to train the club for competition in England in 1929.

=== Cairo 1930 games ===
The Football Association in Israel/Palestine was established on 14 August 1928 and was accepted as a member of FIFA a year later in 1929. The Home Association (now the Israel Football Association) wanted to send a national team to the first World Cup in Uruguay, but because of the boycott imposed by the English Football Association of FIFA at the time the order was given by the British government, it did not allow the team to attend the World Cup.

In April 1930, the team played its first games. The squad travelled to Cairo for a series of games with Egypt. The delegation to Egypt included six Jews and Arabs – one from Nadi Riad al Arab. These players are considered the first Israeli team. The Cairo fixtures were officially played as Tel-Aviv XI against Cairo XI and are treated as unofficial precursor matches, with Mandatory Palestine's official internationals generally counted from the 1934 World Cup qualifier against Egypt.The first game was held in Cairo on April 10 with a full stadium, and the Egyptian team won 5–0.

=== First game in the British Mandate ===
The team's first game was held in Egypt in 1934 against the Egyptian national football team, which they lost 7–1.

== 21st century ==
After Nielsen, coach Avram Grant was appointed to the team, which failed its first tournament but later managed to improve its image and return the selected game audience. During the 2006 World Cup qualifying, Israel finished unbeaten but failed to qualify for the playoffs because of a goal difference.

In 2006, they appointed coach Dror Kashtan, who guided the national team in the Euro 2008 qualifying tournament and presented a series of victories in the exterior of the groups that are rated below a home victory of the Russian team, scoring 2–1, but lost other games and finished the tournament in fourth place, with the same number of points as England. Following the campaign was Israel's first-ever second rate in Europe and later increased its peak position in the world to 15th place. At the end of the early tournament, it was decided that Kashtan will continue to guide the national team in the World Cup 2010 qualifying too. Due to the rise of Israel to rank second in quality in Europe, it won this tournament when the main rivals were supposed to be Greece and Switzerland, along with lower-rated teams Moldova, Latvia and Luxembourg. However, the result was a home loss to Latvia, destroying the chances of Israel's first right house.

The team has not qualified for the World Cup Finals 2022, as they finished third in their group, behind Scotland and Denmark, and in front of Austria, Faroe Islands, and Moldova. As of December 2022, they are currently top of the UEFA Nations League, in League B, Group 1.

== Balance achievements and failures ==
One of the games in Israeli official soccer team history was on 13 October 1993, when Israel's national team played against France's national team in the Parc des Princes stadium in France in 1994 for the World Cup qualifier when France's victory was credited with participation in the World Cup. After the home game against the French team, which lost to Israel 4–0, Israel won 3–2, and following the loss, France lost the World Cup in favour of immigration that came, and Bulgaria finished the tournament in fourth place.

Other big games are the 2–1 victory over Yugoslavia in Belgrade, Rome, in the Olympics qualifier (1960) and the 4–1 victory over Portugal in October 1981 in the World Cup qualifier in 1982, with the striker's hat-trick. In 1999, the ballet team victory was 5–0 in the Ramat Gan Stadium located in Austria. That Israel's national team qualified for the tournament games intersection but was knocked out by Denmark. The team held some great victories, whilst, on the contrary, held some defeats. After Israel refused to play some games, FIFA had decided that Israel would have to deal with decisive games against Wales and lost twice by 0–2.

Until the eighties, the Olympic team and national team were completely identical, or nearly complete. However, the team failed in the Tokyo Olympics in 1964, following the home loss to South Vietnam. Four years later, they came to Israel for the first time in the Olympic football tournament, where the team easily won against Ceylon (now Sri Lanka) 7–0 and 4–0 and qualified for the Olympics in Mexico (1968). The increased team qualified for the quarterfinals in the Olympic tournament, but was eliminated only after a lottery after a 1–1 draw with Bulgaria.

After the 1970 FIFA World Cup, illegal immigration is a failed attempt to qualify for the house twice in early Asia. Israel qualified for the Olympics in between Montreal and again reached the quarterfinals. The 1986 FIFA World Cup qualification is a failed attempt to climb out of the Oceania World Cup. In the 1990 FIFA World Cup qualifying, Israel reached the Oceania playoff game against Colombia, which lost 0–1 and finished in a draw of 0–0 in the Ramat Gan Stadium.

== 1993 to 2010 rating ==
Since 1993, FIFA rankings have been published monthly. The team's rating as of December 2010 is the world's 50th. The highest ranking the team has held was 15th place, in November 2008, under Israeli head coach Dror Kashtan. The lowest ranking the team has held was 71st place, in September 1993, under the guidance of Israeli head coach Shlomo Scharf. On average, the team has placed between 25th and 35th.

== Honours ==
=== Titles ===
FIFA World Cup Inter-confederation play-offs

CONMEBOL v OFC

- Runners-up: 1990 (representing OFC)

CAF/AFC v UEFA

- Runners-up: 1958 (representing CAF/AFC)

OFC second round

- Champions: 1990 (as a non-OFC member)

AFC and OFC Final Round

- Champions: 1970 (representing AFC)

UEFA Group 1

- Third place: 1966 (as a non-UEFA member)

UEFA Group 7 Final Round

- Runners-up: 1962 (as a non-UEFA member)

AFC Asian Cup

- Champions: 1964
- Runners-up: 1956, 1960
- Third place: 1968

Asian Games

- Silver Medal: 1974

=== Awards ===
Overview
Event	1st place	2nd place	3rd place	4th place	5th place
FIFA World Cup	0	0	0	0	0
FIFA World Cup Inter-confederation play-offs					
→ CONMEBOL v OFC	0	1	x	x	x
→ CAF/AFC v UEFA	0	1	x	x	x
→ OFC second round	1	0	0	x	x
→ AFC and OFC Final Round	1	0	x	x	x
→ UEFA Group 1	0	0	1	x	x
→ UEFA Group 7 Final Round	0	1	0	0	x
AFC Asian Cup	1	1+1	1	0	0
Summer Olympic Games	0	0	0	0	1
Asian Games	0	1	0	0	1
UEFA Euro	0	0	x	x	x
UEFA Nations League	0	0	0	0	x
Total	3	6	2	0	2

== See also ==
- Israel national football team
- Mandatory Palestine national football team - (a.k.a. the British Mandate of Palestine/Eretz Israel national football team')
