= 1920–21 Maccabi Tel Aviv F.C. season =

Maccabi Tel Aviv
1920–21 season
- Stadium: Badrani Field

The 1920–21 season was Maccabi Tel Aviv's 15th season since its establishment, in 1906. As the local football association wasn't founded until July 1928, there were no officially organized competitions during the season, and the club played only friendly matches.

== Overview ==
Following its occupation by British troops in 1917–1918, Palestine was governed by the Occupied Enemy Territory Administration. In July 1920, the military administration was replaced by a civilian administration headed by a High Commissioner, allowing civil life to resume following the aftermath of The Great War. Maccabi societies resumed activities in several cities and settlements, including in Tel Aviv.

== Known Matches ==
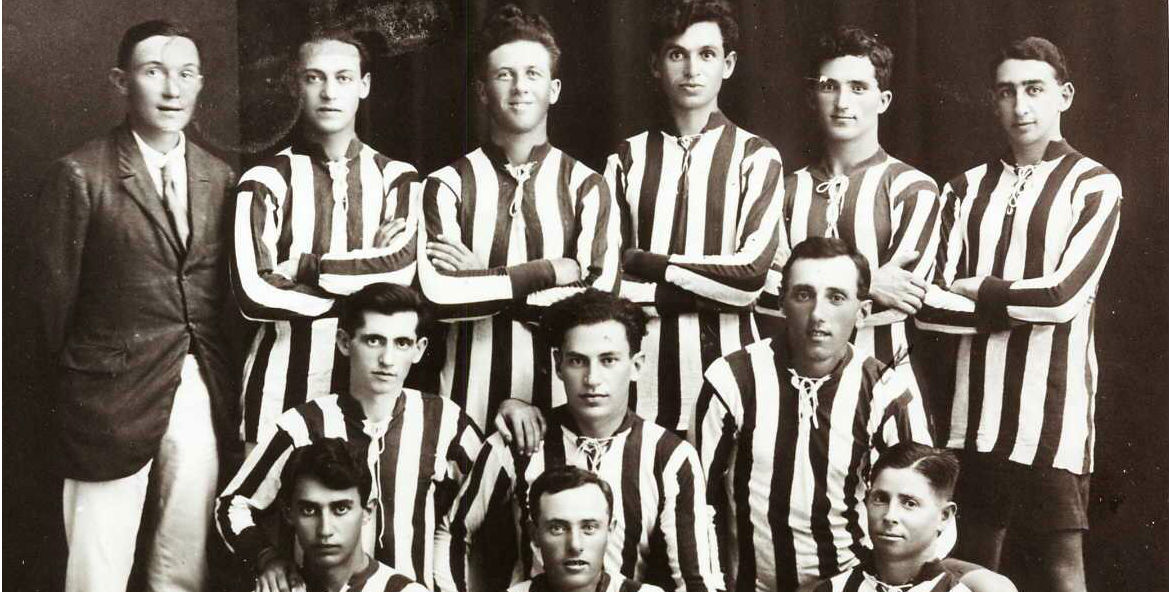
Maccabi Tel Aviv, 1921

As no governing body existed at the time, and with limited possibilities for travel, the football sections of the Jerusalem and Tel Aviv societies played matches, mostly against teams of British soldiers stationed in the vicinity, played mostly between January and March 1921. Following the Jaffa riots in May 1921, footballing activity stopped, except for one match, played on 25 May 1921.

Date	Opponent	Venue	Result	Scorers
21 January 1921	Cavalry regiment, Sarona	Badrani Field (H)	3–0	
28 January 1921	Cavalry regiment, Sarona	Sarona Ground (A)	2–1	
4 February 1921	Christian-Muslim Club Jaffa	Ajami Sports Ground (A)	5–0	
12 March 1921	British Army Officers	Sarona Ground (A)	n/a	The result wasn't given, Maccabi Tel Aviv won.
16 April 1921	Maccabi Jerusalem	Ratisbonne Ground (A)	4–0	
25 May 1921	Iron Duke XI	Badrani Field	n/a	The result wasn't given, Iron Duke won.

== Squad ==
List of players for the match against Maccabi Jerusalem, 16 April 1921:

Kurtzmann; Milo Shmurk, Yosef Vilenchik; Abie Wilson, Baruch Kushnir, Grinfeld; Shimon Ratner (Limek), Eliezer Polani, Katsav, Tiumkin, Ephraim Rubinstein
