= Leumi =

Leumi (Hebrew: לאומי) literally meaning "National" is part of the name of a number national of organizations and businesses. In particular, "Leumi" may refer to:

- Bank Leumi, Israeli bank
- Orr Leumi, Israeli basketball player
- Shimon Leumi, alias of Shimon Ratner (1898–1964), Polish Jewish football player, who played in Austria, Mandate Palestine, and Israel
