= Amnon Harlap =

Israeli footballer

Amnon Harlap אמנון חרל"פ
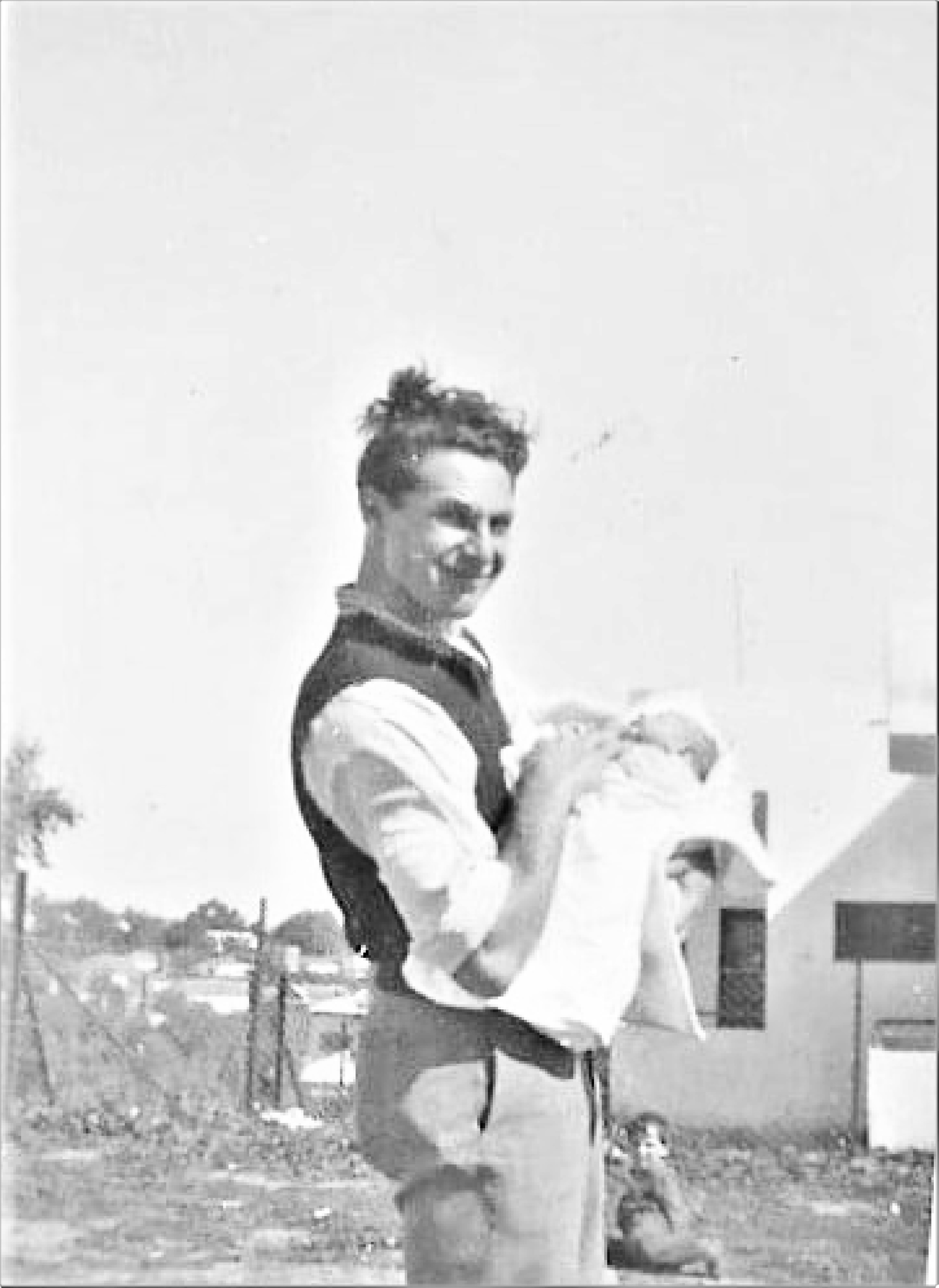

Personal information
- Date of birth: 13 December 1909
- Place of birth: Rehovot, Ottoman Palestine
- Date of death: 29 May 2006 (aged 96)
- Place of death: Israel
- Position: Forward

Youth career
- 1925: Nordia Tel Aviv
- 1925: HaGibor Tel Aviv
- 1925–1927: Allenby Tel Aviv

Senior career*
Years	Team	Apps	(Gls)
1927–1930	Hapoel Tel Aviv		
1930–1931	ARA La Gantoise 2 (0)		
1931–1935	Hapoel Tel Aviv		
1935–1937	Hapoel Rehovot		

International career
1934	Eretz Israel	2	(0)
- * Club domestic league appearances and goals

Amnon Harlap (Hebrew: אמנון חרל"פ; 13 December 1909 – 29 May 2006) was an Israeli footballer, who played for Hapoel Tel Aviv and the Mandatory Palestine national football team.

== Playing career ==
Harlap was born in Rehovot in 1909, and started playing football with friends in his hometown. At high-school age, he attended the Herzliya Hebrew Gymnasium in Tel Aviv, where he joined local youth club Allenby Tel Aviv, which was initially affiliated with Maccabi Tel Aviv, but its members decided to withdraw from Maccabi, due to the professional attitude towards sports and merged in 1927 with Hapoel Tel Aviv. Harlap stayed with Hapoel until 1935, but in loan one year to Belgium by ARA La Gantoise where he play two games in Second Division. When he was forced to retire from football due to injury. Harlap won 2 championships and 2 cups, scoring the first goal in the 1934 cup final. Harlap was also part of the Mandatory Palestine national football team, and played two matches for the team, against Egypt in 1934.

== Personal life ==
After retiring, Harlap lived in Rehovot, where he worked at the family's business, a construction materials shop. He was also a board member of Hapoel Rehovot. He was brother-in-low of Yitzhak Katz, who married Harlap's sister, Bat-Sheva. His great-nephew is singer and actor Gidi Gov.

== Honours ==
- League Championships (2):
  - 1933–34, 1934–35
- Cup (2):
  - 1928, 1934
