= List of international goals scored by Eran Zahavi =

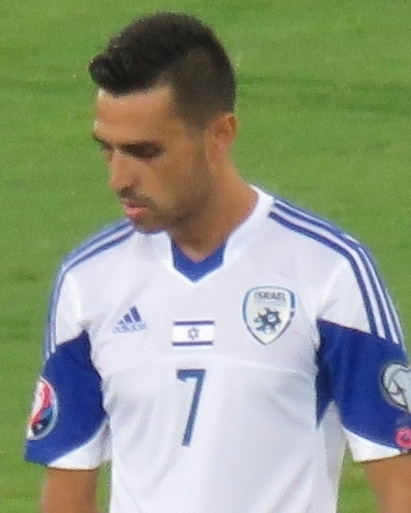
Zahavi playing for Israel in 2015

Eran Zahavi is a former professional footballer who represented the Israel national team between 2010 and 2024. With 35 goals in 74 appearances, he is the nation's all-time leading goalscorer.

== Goals ==
Israel score listed first, score column indicates score after each Zahavi goal.

International goals by cap, date, venue, opponent, score, result and competition
No.	Date	Venue	Cap	Opponent	Score	Result	Competition
1	10 September 2013	Petrovsky Stadium, Saint Petersburg, Russia	15	Russia	1–3	1–3	2014 FIFA World Cup qualification
2	1 June 2014	BBVA Compass Stadium, Houston, United States	20	Honduras	1–0	4–2	Friendly
3	16 November 2014	Sammy Ofer Stadium, Haifa, Israel	23	Bosnia and Herzegovina	3–0	3–0	UEFA Euro 2016 qualifying
4	3 September 2015	Sammy Ofer Stadium, Haifa, Israel	27	Andorra	1–0	4–0	UEFA Euro 2016 qualifying
5	31 May 2016	Karađorđe Stadium, Novi Sad, Serbia	31	Serbia	1–1	1–3	Friendly
6	12 November 2016	Elbasan Arena, Elbasan, Albania	32	Albania	1–0	3–0	2018 FIFA World Cup qualification
7	15 November 2018	Netanya Stadium, Netanya, Israel	41	Guatemala	1–0	7–0	Friendly
8	20 November 2018	Hampden Park, Glasgow, Scotland	42	Scotland	2–3	2–3	2018–19 UEFA Nations League C
9	21 March 2019	Sammy Ofer Stadium, Haifa, Israel	43	Slovenia	1–1	1–1	UEFA Euro 2020 qualifying
10	24 March 2019	Sammy Ofer Stadium, Haifa, Israel	44	Austria	1–1	4–2	UEFA Euro 2020 qualifying
11	24 March 2019	Sammy Ofer Stadium, Haifa, Israel	44	Austria	2–1	4–2	UEFA Euro 2020 qualifying
12	24 March 2019	Sammy Ofer Stadium, Haifa, Israel	44	Austria	3–1	4–2	UEFA Euro 2020 qualifying
13	7 June 2019	Daugava Stadium, Riga, Latvia	45	Latvia	1–0	3–0	UEFA Euro 2020 qualifying
14	7 June 2019	Daugava Stadium, Riga, Latvia	45	Latvia	2–0	3–0	UEFA Euro 2020 qualifying
15	7 June 2019	Daugava Stadium, Riga, Latvia	45	Latvia	3–0	3–0	UEFA Euro 2020 qualifying
16	5 September 2019	Turner Stadium, Be'er Sheva, Israel	47	North Macedonia	1–0	1–1	UEFA Euro 2020 qualifying
17	9 September 2019	Stožice Stadium, Ljubljana, Slovenia	48	Slovenia	2–1	2–3	UEFA Euro 2020 qualifying
18	10 October 2019	Ernst-Happel-Stadion, Vienna, Austria	49	Austria	1–0	1–3	UEFA Euro 2020 qualifying
19	15 October 2019	Turner Stadium, Be'er Sheva, Israel	50	Latvia	2–0	3–1	UEFA Euro 2020 qualifying
20	4 September 2020	Hampden Park, Glasgow, Scotland	53	Scotland	1–1	1–1	2020–21 UEFA Nations League B
21	11 October 2020	Sammy Ofer Stadium, Haifa, Israel	56	Czech Republic	1–2	1–2	2020–21 UEFA Nations League B
22	14 October 2020	Anton Malatinský Stadium, Trnava, Slovakia	57	Slovakia	1–2	3–2	2020–21 UEFA Nations League B
23	14 October 2020	Anton Malatinský Stadium, Trnava, Slovakia	57	Slovakia	2–2	3–2	2020–21 UEFA Nations League B
24	14 October 2020	Anton Malatinský Stadium, Trnava, Slovakia	57	Slovakia	3–2	3–2	2020–21 UEFA Nations League B
25	31 March 2021	Zimbru Stadium, Chișinău, Moldova	62	Moldova	1–1	4–1	2022 FIFA World Cup qualification
26	5 June 2021	City Stadium, Podgorica, Montenegro	63	Montenegro	1–0	3–1	Friendly
27	1 September 2021	Tórsvøllur, Tórshavn, Faroe Islands	65	Faroe Islands	1–0	4–0	2022 FIFA World Cup qualification
28	1 September 2021	Tórsvøllur, Tórshavn, Faroe Islands	65	Faroe Islands	2–0	4–0	2022 FIFA World Cup qualification
29	1 September 2021	Tórsvøllur, Tórshavn, Faroe Islands	65	Faroe Islands	4–0	4–0	2022 FIFA World Cup qualification
30	4 September 2021	Sammy Ofer Stadium, Haifa, Israel	66	Austria	3–0	5–2	2022 FIFA World Cup qualification
31	4 September 2021	Sammy Ofer Stadium, Haifa, Israel	66	Austria	5–2	5–2	2022 FIFA World Cup qualification
32	9 October 2021	Hampden Park, Glasgow, Scotland	68	Scotland	1–0	2–3	2022 FIFA World Cup qualification
33	12 October 2021	Turner Stadium, Be'er Sheva, Israel	69	Moldova	1–0	2–1	2022 FIFA World Cup qualification
34	18 November 2023	Pancho Aréna, Felcsút, Hungary	73	Romania	1–0	1–2	UEFA Euro 2024 qualifying
35	21 March 2024	Szusza Ferenc Stadion, Budapest, Hungary	74	Iceland	1–0	1–4	UEFA Euro 2024 qualifying play-offs

== Statistics ==
Appearances and goals by year
Year	Apps	Goals
2010	3	0
2011	5	0
2012	3	0
2013	6	1
2014	6	2
2015	7	1
2016	5	2
2017	4	0
2018	3	2
2019	10	11
2020	7	5
2021	11	9
2022	0	0
2023	3	1
2024	1	1
Total	74	35

Goals by competition
Competition	Goals
UEFA European Championship qualifying	15
FIFA World Cup qualification	10
UEFA Nations League	6
Friendlies	4
Total	35
