= 1938 Palestine Cup =

Tournament details
- Country: Mandatory Palestine

Final positions
- Champions: Hapoel Tel Aviv (4th title)
- Runners-up: Maccabi Tel Aviv

The 1938 Palestine Cup (Hebrew: הגביע הארץ-ישראלי, HaGavia HaEretz-Israeli) was the ninth season of Israeli Football Association's nationwide football cup competition. The defending holders were Hapoel Tel Aviv.

For the third time since the beginning of the competition, the two senior Tel Aviv clubs, Hapoel and Maccabi met in the final. Hapoel won 2–1, securing its fourth cup and its second double.

== Results ==
=== First round ===
Home team	Score	Away team
Hapoel Tel Aviv	6–2	2nd Battalion Black Watch
Hapoel HaKochav Tel Aviv	0–2	Hakoah Tel Aviv
Maccabi Nes Tziona	1–0	British Police
RAF Ramla	1–6	Maccabi Tel Aviv
Hapoel Herzliya	0–2	Hapoel Haifa
Rainessance Jerusalem	w/o	1st Battalion Royal Scots
Maccabi Haifa	0–4	Degel Zion Tel Aviv

=== Quarter-finals ===
Home team	Score	Away team
Hapoel Haifa	1–0	1st Battalion Royal Scots
Hakoah Tel Aviv	2–0	Maccabi Avshalom Petah Tikva
Maccabi Nes Tziona	1–3	Maccabi Tel Aviv
Hapoel Tel Aviv	6–1	Degel Zion Tel Aviv

=== Semi-finals ===
Home team	Score	Away team
Hakoah Tel Aviv	1–2	Maccabi Tel Aviv
Hapoel Haifa	3–3 (a.e.t.)	Hapoel Tel Aviv

==== Replay ====
Home team	Score	Away team
Hapoel Tel Aviv	1–1 (a.e.t.)	Hapoel Haifa

==== Second replay ====
Home team	Score	Away team
Hapoel Tel Aviv	5–2	Hapoel Haifa

=== Final ===
28 May 1938

Hapoel Tel Aviv	2–1	Maccabi Tel Aviv
Poliakov 10'; Nudelman 50'		25' (pen.) Neufeld

Maccabiah Stadium, Tel Aviv
Referee: Jastrzembski
