= Gedalyahu Fuchs =

Association football player (1911–1966)

Personal information
- Date of birth: 11 March 1911
- Place of birth: Mateești, Vâlcea County, Kingdom of Romania
- Date of death: 1 January 1966 (aged 54)
- Place of death: Haifa, Israel
- Height: 1.78 m (5 ft 10 in)
- Position: Midfielder

Senior career*
Years	Team	Apps	(Gls)
1926–1929	Shimshon		
1929–1931	Hakoah Czernowitz		
1931–1947	Hapoel Haifa		

International career
1934–1938	Mandatory Palestine	4	(0)

Managerial career
- 1954–1955: Hapoel Haifa
- * Club domestic league appearances and goals

Gedalyahu Fuchs (Hebrew: גדליהו פוקס; born 11 March 1911 – 1 January 1966) was a Romanian-Jewish footballer and manager. He was the first captain of the Mandatory Palestine national football team, the forerunner of the Israel national football team.

== Biography ==
Fuchs was born in Mateești, Vâlcea County, and joined a local Jewish football club Shimshon at the age of 15. At the age of 18, after his family disowned him for his fascination with football, Fuchs moved to Cernăuți, where he played for the local Hakoah club. In 1931 Fuchs immigrated to Palestine and joined Hapoel Haifa, where he played until his retirement in 1947, with his final match played against visiting MTK Budapest. Fuchs was part of the team that reached the 1932 Palestine Cup final, which was abandoned as Hapoel Haifa left the pitch in protest over the referee's decision to award their opponents, British Police a penalty kick.

Fuchs was part of the national team squad for the 1934 World Cup and 1938 World Cup qualification tournaments, playing four matches and captaining the team.

After retiring, Fuchs joined the board of Hapoel Haifa and coached the team's youth team and senior team.
