= Zalman Friedmann =

Israeli footballer (1912–1987)

Zalman Friedmann זלמן פרידמן
Personal information
- Date of birth: 1912
- Date of death: 6 May 1987 (aged 74–75)
- Position: Midfielder

Senior career*
Years	Team	Apps	(Gls)
1930–1940	Hapoel Tel Aviv		

International career
1934–1940	Mandatory Palestine	3	(0)
- * Club domestic league appearances and goals

Zalman Friedmann (Hebrew: זלמן פרידמן; 1912 – 6 May 1987), also nicknamed Dzampa, was an Israeli footballer who played as a midfielder for Beitar Tel Aviv and the Mandatory Palestine national team.

Friedmann represented Mandatory Palestine in both their first and last international match, respectively against Egypt in 1934 and Lebanon in 1940; he made three official international caps.
