= 1934 Palestine Cup =

Tournament details
- Country: Mandatory Palestine
- Teams: 7

Final positions
- Champions: Hapoel Tel Aviv (2nd title)
- Runners-up: Maccabi Tel Aviv

Tournament statistics
- Matches played: 6
- Goals scored: 27 (4.5 per match)

The 1934 Palestine Cup (Hebrew: הגביע הארץ-ישראלי, HaGavia HaEretz-Israeli) was the sixth season of Israeli Football Association's nationwide football cup competition. The defending holders were Maccabi Tel Aviv.

For the second year in a row, Maccabi Tel Aviv and Hapoel Tel Aviv met in the final. This time the winners were Hapoel Tel Aviv, winning their second final.

== Results ==
=== Quarter-finals ===
Home team	Score	Away team
Hapoel Jerusalem	0–4	Maccabi Tel Aviv
Maccabi Petah Tikva	0–7	Hapoel Tel Aviv
Hapoel Haifa	4–1	Maccabi Hasmonean Jerusalem

Bye: Maccabi Nes Tziona

=== Semi-finals ===
Home team	Score	Away team
Maccabi Tel Aviv	3–1	Hapoel Haifa
Hapoel Tel Aviv	2–0	Maccabi Nes Tziona

=== Final ===
2 June 1934

Hapoel Tel Aviv	3–2	Maccabi Tel Aviv
Harlap 12'; Berger (pen.); Zimon		2' Neufeld; Beit haLevi

Maccabi Avshalem Petah Tikva ground
Referee: Adler
