= Hapoel HaKochav Tel Aviv F.C. =

Hapoel HaKochav Tel Aviv
- Full name: Hapoel HaKochav Tel Aviv Football Club הפועל הכוכב תל אביב
- Founded: 1936
- Dissolved: 1938
- 1937: 4th (North division)

Hapoel HaKochav Tel Aviv (Hebrew: הפועל הכוכב תל אביב) was a football club in the Shabazi neighborhood of Tel Aviv, which operated during the British mandate of Palestine. The club played one season in Liga Bet prior to the Israeli Declaration of Independence, as well as playing in the 1937 and 1938 editions of the Palestine Cup.

After the 1948 Arab–Israeli War, another club, Maccabi Shmuel Tel Aviv was established in the Shabazi neighborhood, named after Shmuel Yefet, a former board member of Hakochav Tel Aviv.
