= Israel national football team =

Men's association football team

Israel
- Nickname(s): התכולים-לבנים (The Skyblue and Whites)
- Association: Israel Football Association (IFA)
- Confederation: UEFA (Europe; 1980–81; 1991–present); OFC (Oceania; 1985–89); AFC (Asia; 1954–74)
- Head coach: Ran Ben-Shimon
- Captain: Eli Dasa
- Most caps: Yossi Benayoun (101) (Note: Yossi Benayoun also played and scored against Romania B; however, this was not a full international match and is therefore not included.)
- Top scorer: Eran Zahavi (35)
- Home stadium: Various
- FIFA code: ISR
| First colours | Second colours |

FIFA ranking
- Current: 76 ▲1 (18 November 2026)
- Highest: 15 (November 2008)
- Lowest: 99 (January 2018)

First international
- Egypt 5–0 Mandatory Palestine (Cairo, Egypt; 4 April 1930) as the State of Israel: US Olympic Team 3–1 Israel (New York, United States; 26 September 1948)

Biggest win
- Israel 9–0 Chinese Taipei (Wellington, New Zealand; 23 March 1988)

Biggest defeat
- Germany 7–1 Israel (Kaiserslautern, Germany; 13 February 2002)

World Cup
- Appearances: 1 (first in 1970)
- Best result: Group stage (1970)

Asian Cup
- Appearances: 4 (first in 1956)
- Best result: Champions (1964)

Asian Games
- Appearances: 2 (first in 1958)
- Best result: (silver) Silver Medal (1974)
Medal record
AFC Asian Cup
| Silver medal – second place | 1956 Hong Kong | Team |
| Silver medal – second place | 1960 South Korea | Team |
| Gold medal – first place | 1964 Israel | Team |
| Bronze medal – third place | 1968 Iran | Team |
Asian Games
| Silver medal – second place | 1974 Iran | Team |

The Israel national football team (Hebrew: נבחרת ישראל בכדורגל, romanized: Nivḥeret Yīsrāʾēl BeḴaduregel) represents Israel in men's international football, and is governed by the Israel Football Association. They have been members of the European Confederation UEFA since 1994.

Israel qualified for the FIFA World Cup for the first and to date, only time, in 1970. They also won the 1964 AFC Asian Cup, before a forced relocation to UEFA.

== History ==
=== Early history ===
Football has a long tradition in Israel. The game was originally introduced during the time of the Ottoman Empire. The Palestine Football Association was formed in August 1928, and joined FIFA in June 1929, but at the time the association was made up of Arab and Jewish clubs as well as clubs of British policemen and soldiers serving in the region during the British Mandate. The Mandatory Palestine national football team made its debut against Cairo (Egypt) in 1934 FIFA World Cup qualification, losing 0–5 in Cairo, Egypt. The team played five international matches, including a friendly match against Lebanon that Palestine won 1–5; until the British Mandate for Palestine national team was dissolved. During these five games, the national team fielded only Jewish players. Three anthems were played before each match: the British "God Save the King", the Jewish (and future Israeli) "HaTikvah", and the opposing team's anthem.

In 1948 the team became the national football team of Israel. The Israel national team's first match as an independent nation was on 26 September 1948, against the US Olympic Team. The game was won by the US 1–3, and in the 20th minute of the game Shmuel Ben-Dror scored the first goal after the creation of the State of Israel.

=== Asian Football Confederation membership ===
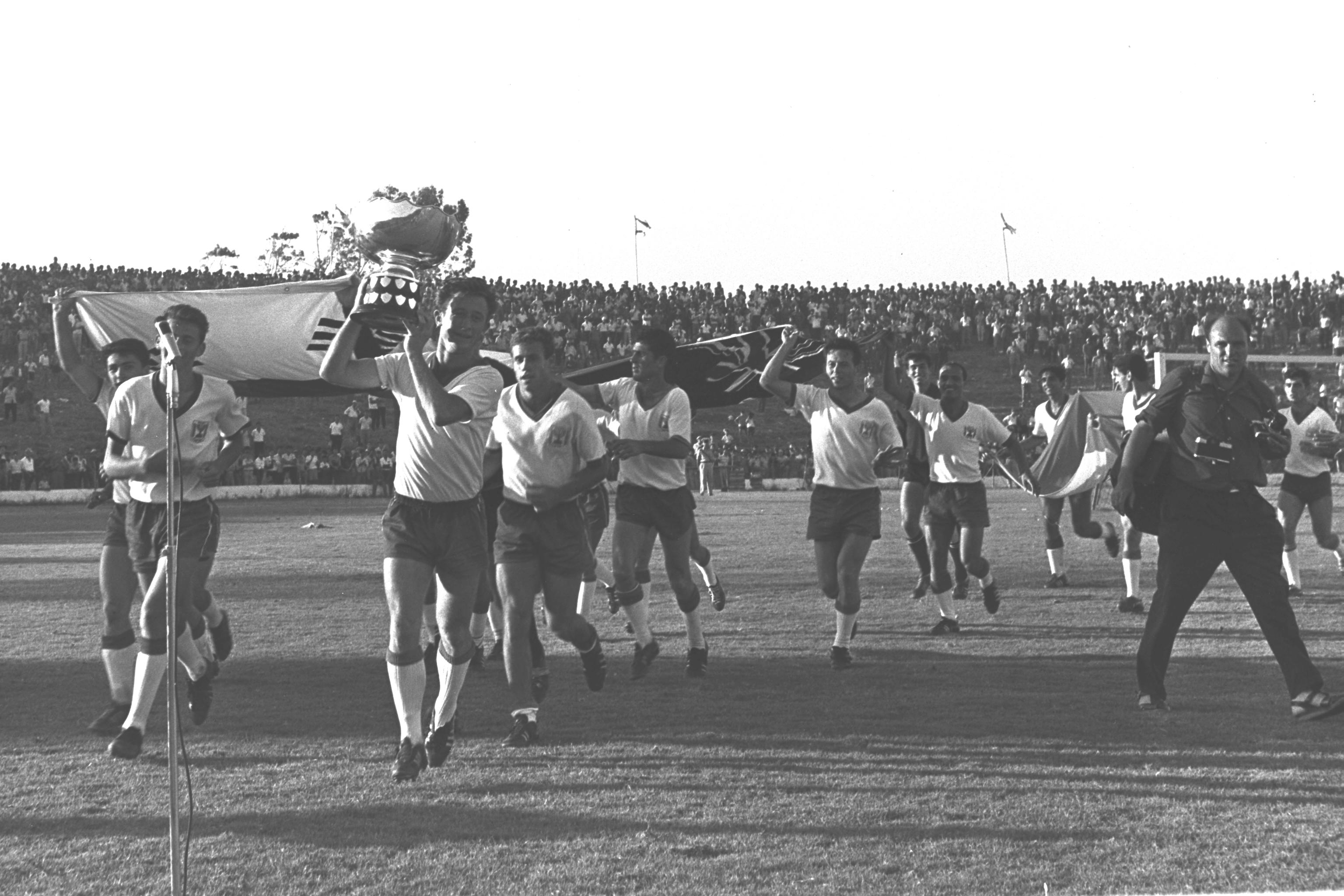
Israel winning the 1964 AFC Asian Cup

==== Muslim and Arab countries boycotting Israel ====
Israel was one of the founding members of the Asian Football Confederation (AFC) following its independence in 1948. After the 1974 Asian Games in Iran, and Israel's 0–1 tense loss to Iran in the finals, Kuwait and other Muslim and Arab countries refused to play them. Following this, Israel was expelled from the confederation. It tried to join continental bodies such as the OFC (Oceania), before eventually joining UEFA (Europe).

==== Israel's last years in the AFC ====
Israel competed at the AFC between 1954 and 1974. Due to the Arab League boycott of Israel, several Muslim countries refused to compete against Israel. The political situation culminated in Israel winning the 1958 World Cup qualifying stage for Asia and Africa without playing a single game, forcing FIFA to schedule a playoff between Israel and Wales to ensure the team did not qualify without playing at least one game (which Wales won).

Israel hosted and won the 1964 AFC Asian Cup.

In 1968, Israel went to its first Olympic Games and lost to Bulgaria in the quarterfinals.

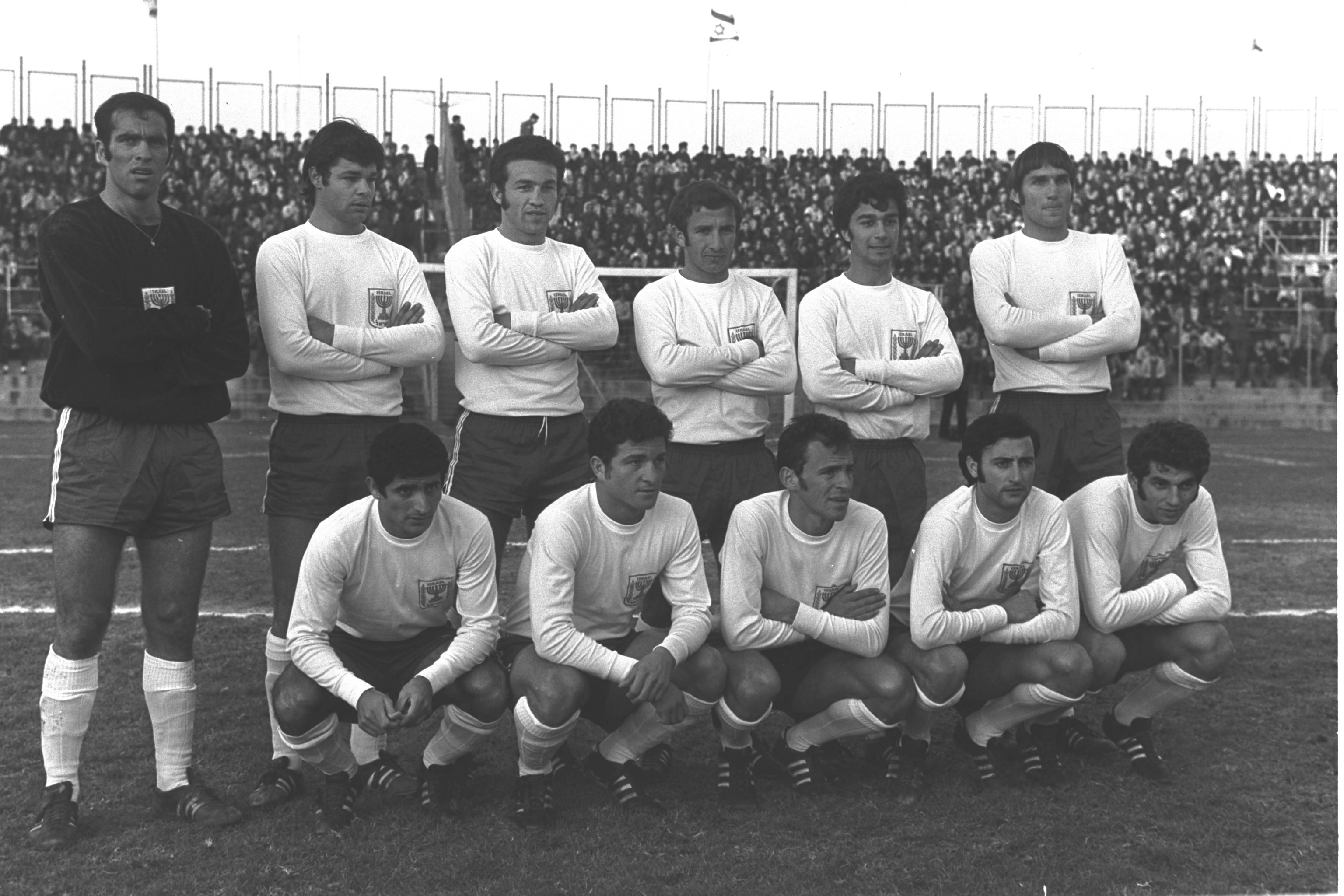
1970's Israel national team at the Bloomfield Stadium of Tel Aviv, Israel

In 1969, Israel qualified for its first and only FIFA World Cup, via Asia/Oceania. Israel earned two points after a 1–1 draw with Sweden, a 0–0 draw with eventual finalist Italy, and a 0–2 loss to Uruguay. The goal against Sweden, scored by Mordechai Spiegler, is Israel's only FIFA World Cup goal to date.

In 1974, Israel was excluded from AFC competitions, after Kuwait and other Muslim and Arab countries refused to play against it. The proposal was adopted by a vote of 17 to 13 with 6 abstentions. The vote coincided with the 1974 Asian Games, where the football competition was marred by the refusal of both North Korea and Kuwait to play second-round matches against Israel.

In 1976, Israel went to its second Olympic Games and lost in the quarterfinals again, this time against Brazil. In 1973 and 1977, Israel participated in the World Cup qualification tournament which included teams from both Asia and Oceania, but failed to qualify.

=== Years in exile ===
==== First steps in UEFA ====
During the early 1980s, Israel played the majority of its matches against UEFA (Europe) teams, and competed in the European stage of qualification for the 1982 FIFA World Cup.

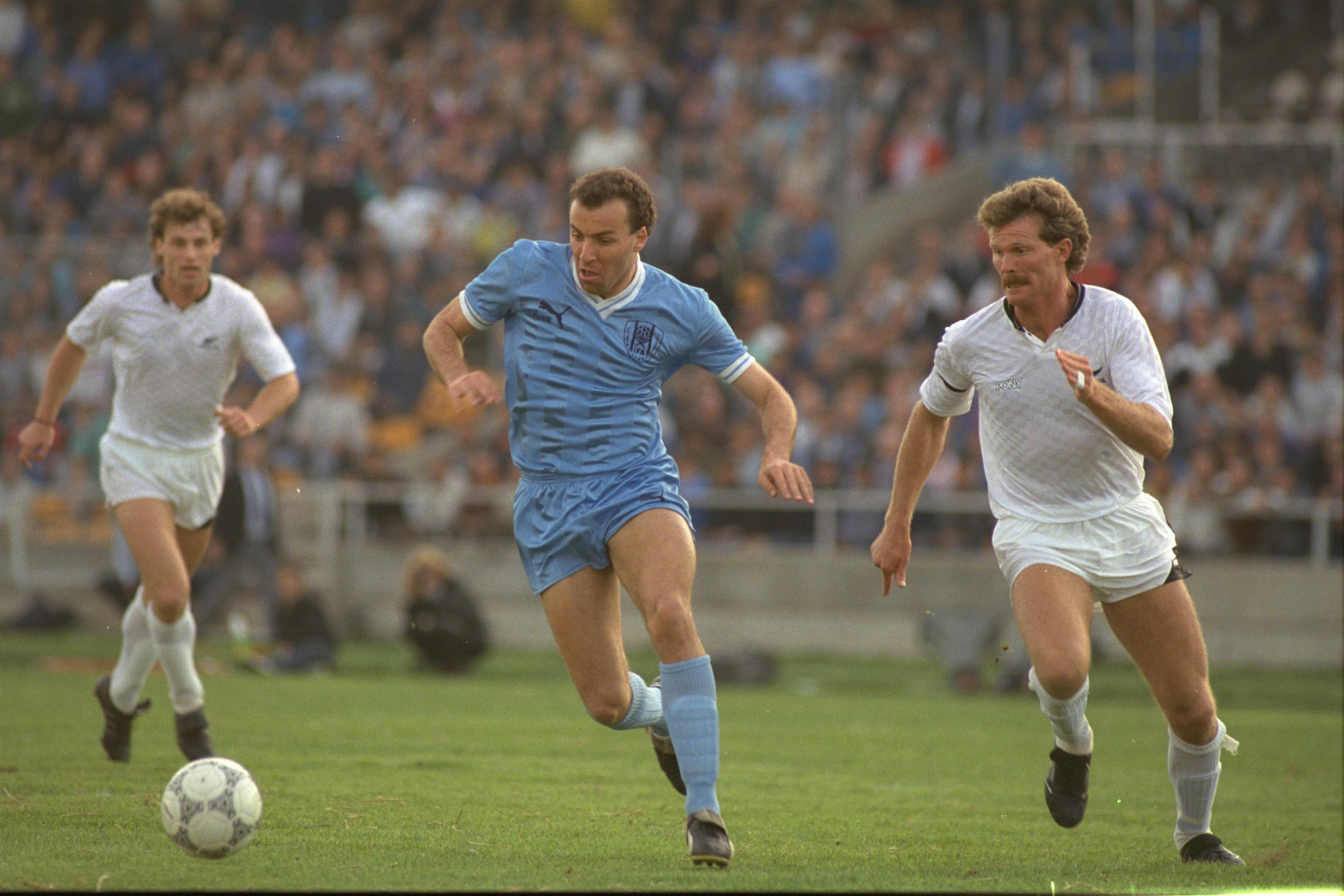
Ronny Rosenthal playing for Israel at the 1990 FIFA World Cup qualification (Oceania) against New Zealand

==== First steps in OFC ====
For the next two tournaments, Israel entered Oceania's (OFC) qualification stage.

In 1989, Israel won the OFC second round (Oceania) by finishing above both Australia and New Zealand. As a result, Israel made it to the CONMEBOL–OFC play-offs to represent Oceania and play against CONMEBOL's (South America) Colombia for the 1990 World Cup, but lost (1–0, 0–0).

=== UEFA membership ===
In 1991, Israeli clubs began participating in European club competitions of UEFA, and Israel returned to the European leg of World Cup qualifying in 1992. In 1994, Israel received full UEFA membership, 20 years after it had left Asia. Within Europe, Israel has been a relatively minor nation, though with some successes, notably winning 3–2 in Paris against France in 1993, and 5–0 against Austria in 1999. That year, Israel made it to the UEFA Euro 2000 qualifying play-offs, but was beaten by Denmark.

Israel came close to advancing to the playoff stage in their 2006 World Cup qualifying group, finishing third, behind France, and tied on points with Switzerland, which also remained unbeaten in 10 matches after 4 wins and 6 draws. The Swiss had a better goal difference, though, and advanced to the qualification play-off. Coach Avram Grant announced his resignation on 26 October 2005. After the end of his contract, he was succeeded by Dror Kashtan.

In UEFA Euro 2008 qualifying, Israel came very close to qualifying for the final tournament, but finished fourth in Group E, just one point behind second-placed Russia, who qualified directly with Croatia, and level on 23 points with England, who also failed to advance. The 4–3 home loss to Croatia was the first loss after 13 consecutive official games and 9 home games without a loss.

In 2010 FIFA World Cup qualification, Israel again came in fourth, behind Switzerland, Greece, and Latvia. For the UEFA Euro 2012 qualifying campaign, Kashtan was replaced as coach by Frenchman Luis Fernández but Israel failed to qualify again, finishing third behind Greece and Croatia.

The continued presence of the Israeli Football Association in UEFA was a precedent cited by Australia to justify its transfer from the Oceania Football Confederation to the Asian Football Confederation.

In 2018, Willi Ruttensteiner was appointed as technical director. A national football academy was founded and three supporting development centers were established.

Israel subsequently failed to qualify for any World Cup or European Championship finals, and performed inconsistently during the qualifying phases in which they took part, alternating between the good and the not-so-good. However, in the qualifiers for Euro 2020, they came very close to making history. Despite finishing 5th and penultimate in their particularly homogeneous qualifying group, Israel earned the right to play in the play-offs thanks to their position in the 2018–19 edition of the Nations League. They first had to play in the semi-final of the Path C play-off in Scotland to earn the right to play in the final of the play-off in Serbia, which defeated Norway away in extra time. The game was tight, and the Israelis were finally eliminated in a penalty shoot-out after a goalless draw in regulation time and extra time (0–0, 3:5), Eran Zahavi having missed the first Israeli shot.

Promoted to League B for the 2020–21 edition of the Nations League without having finished top of their group in the previous edition, thanks to the change of format subsequently decided by UEFA, Israel ensured their survival by finishing 3rd and penultimate in their group, with a balanced record of 2 wins, 2 draws and 2 defeats. At the 2022–23 Nations League, Israel finished top of its 3-team group (Russia, which should have taken part, was excluded from European and international competitions due to its aggression against Ukraine), thanks to 2 wins over Albania (2–1 in both legs) and 2 draws against Iceland (2–2 on each occasion), synonymous with promotion to League A for the 2024–25 edition.

In the Euro 2024 qualifiers, Israel was again eliminated at the play-off stage, as in the previous edition. Indeed, they finished 3rd in their qualifying group and saw their place in the play-offs assured thanks to their status as group winners at the 2022-2023 Nations League. Against Iceland in the semi-finals of the play-offs for Path B, they opened the scoring with Eran Zahavi's 31st-minute penalty, but failed to hold on to their advantage and were soundly beaten (1–4). The turning points of the match were Roy Revivo's 73rd-minute red card for a crude foul, and Eran Zahavi's penalty miss 7 minutes after the red card, when the score was 1–2.

The Norwegian Football Federation has repeatedly lobbied for Israel to be removed from UEFA and for FIFA to ban them due to their ongoing conflict with Palestine. When the two met in 2026 World Cup qualification, Norway donated all ticket proceeds towards helping Palestinian foundations. Israel would come third in their qualification group, behind Norway and Italy and failing to advance to the next round.

== Home stadium ==
The first home game of the Israel national football team was at Palms Ground on 6 April 1934 against Egypt in a 1934 World Cup qualifier. Prior to the formation of Israel, they also played at the Maccabi Ground for the 1938 FIFA World Cup qualifiers and Maccabiah Stadium. The first national team to represent the newly formed State of Israel back in 1948, had played at the Ramat Gan Stadium as part of 1954 FIFA World Cup qualification, in front of 55,000 spectators. The Ramat Gan Stadium would remain Israel's home stadium until 2013.

Since the construction of Sammy Ofer Stadium in the city of Haifa, Teddy Stadium in the city of Jerusalem, Turner Stadium in the city of Be'er Sheva, Netanya Stadium in the city of Netanya and Bloomfield Stadium in the city of Tel Aviv – the Israel national team has rotated their official home matches between the latter five.

During the Gaza war beginning in 2023, Israel played most of their home matches in Hungary.

=== Active stadiums ===
| Matches | Image | Stadium | Capacity | Location | First match | Last match |
|---|---|---|---|---|---|---|
| 51 | UEFA | Bloomfield Stadium | 29,400 | Tel Aviv, Israel | 17 May 1964 | 12 September 2023 |
| 14 | UEFA | Teddy Stadium | 31,733 | Jerusalem, Israel | 12 February 1992 | 19 June 2023 |
| 12 | UEFA | Sammy Ofer Stadium | 30,950 | Haifa, Israel | 16 November 2014 | 2 June 2022 |
| 9 | UEFA | Netanya Stadium | 13,610 | Netanya, Israel | 6 February 2013 | 29 March 2022 |
| 4 | UEFA | Turner Stadium | 16,126 | Be'er Sheva, Israel | 14 October 2018 | 12 October 2021 |

=== Inactive stadiums ===
| Matches | Image | Stadium | Capacity | Location | First match | Last match |
|---|---|---|---|---|---|---|
| 137 | | Ramat Gan Stadium | 41,583 | Ramat Gan, Israel | 8 March 1954 | 15 October 2013 |
| 3 | | Maccabiah Stadium | 20,000 | Tel Aviv, Israel | 30 July 1949 | 28 October 1950 |

== Kit suppliers ==
| Kit supplier | Origin | Period |
|---|---|---|
| Umbro | United Kingdom | 1970 |
| Diadora | Italy | 1992–1995 |
| Adidas | Germany | 2008–2018 |
| Puma | Germany | 1985–1989 1996–2008 2018–2024 |
| Reebok | United States | 2025– |

== Results and fixtures ==
The following is a list of match results in the last 12 months, as well as any future matches that have been scheduled.

Win Draw Loss Fixture

=== 2026 ===
| 26 March 2026 Friendly | Georgia | 2–2 | Israel | Tbilisi, Georgia |
| 20:00 UTC+4 | Kvaratskhelia 36', 54' | Report | Mizrahi 60'; Gandelman 64' | Stadium: Mikheil Meskhi Stadium; Attendance: 16,556; Referee: Julian Weinberger (Austria) |

| 3 June 2026 Friendly | Albania | 0–1 | Israel | Tirana, Albania |
| 20:00 UTC+2 | | Report | Gloukh 73' | Stadium: Arena Kombëtare; Attendance: 6,600; Referee: Miloš Savović (Montenegro) |

| 24 September 2026 2026–27 UEFA Nations League | Austria | 3–1 | Israel | Linz, Austria |
| 20:45 UTC+2 | Schmid 43' (pen.); Mwene 90'; Kalajdžić 90+3' | Report | Abu Farchi 55' | Stadium: Raiffeisen Arena; Attendance: 15,200; Referee: Georgi Kabakov (Bulgaria) |

| 27 September 2026 2026–27 UEFA Nations League | Israel | 0–3 | Republic of Ireland | Debrecen, Hungary (Note: Due to the Gaza war, Israel are required to play their home matches at neutral venues until further notice.) |
| 20:45 UTC+2 | | Report | Parrott 13'; Idah 16'; Moylan 25' | Stadium: Nagyerdei Stadion; Attendance: 319; Referee: Harm Osmers (Germany) |

| 1 October 2026 2026–27 UEFA Nations League | Israel | 0–0 | Kosovo | Debrecen, Hungary |
| 21:45 UTC+2 | | Report | | Stadium: Nagyerdei Stadion; Attendance: 440; Referee: Radu Petrescu (Romania) |

| 4 October 2026 2026–27 UEFA Nations League | Republic of Ireland | 1–1 | Israel | Bačka Topola, Serbia (Note: Moved from Ireland to Serbia after the FAI Board decided to move the fixture to a neutral territory due to "operational challenges that could impact on the delivery of the game on home soil.") |
| 19:45 UTC+1 | Parrott 39' | Report | D. Peretz 47' | Stadium: TSC Arena; Attendance: 0 (Behind closed doors); Referee: Juan Martínez Munuera (Spain) |

| 14 November 2026 2026–27 UEFA Nations League | Kosovo | 0–0 | Israel | Pristina, Kosovo |
| 15:00 UTC+1 | | Report | | Stadium: Fadil Vokrri Stadium; Attendance: 12,426; Referee: Ivan Kružliak (Slovakia) |

| 17 November 2026 2026–27 UEFA Nations League | Israel | 1–1 | Austria | Debrecen, Hungary |
| 21:45 UTC+2 | Do. Peretz 36' | Report | Kalajdžić 62' | Stadium: Nagyerdei Stadion; Attendance: 510; Referee: Davide Massa (Italy) |

== Coaching staff ==
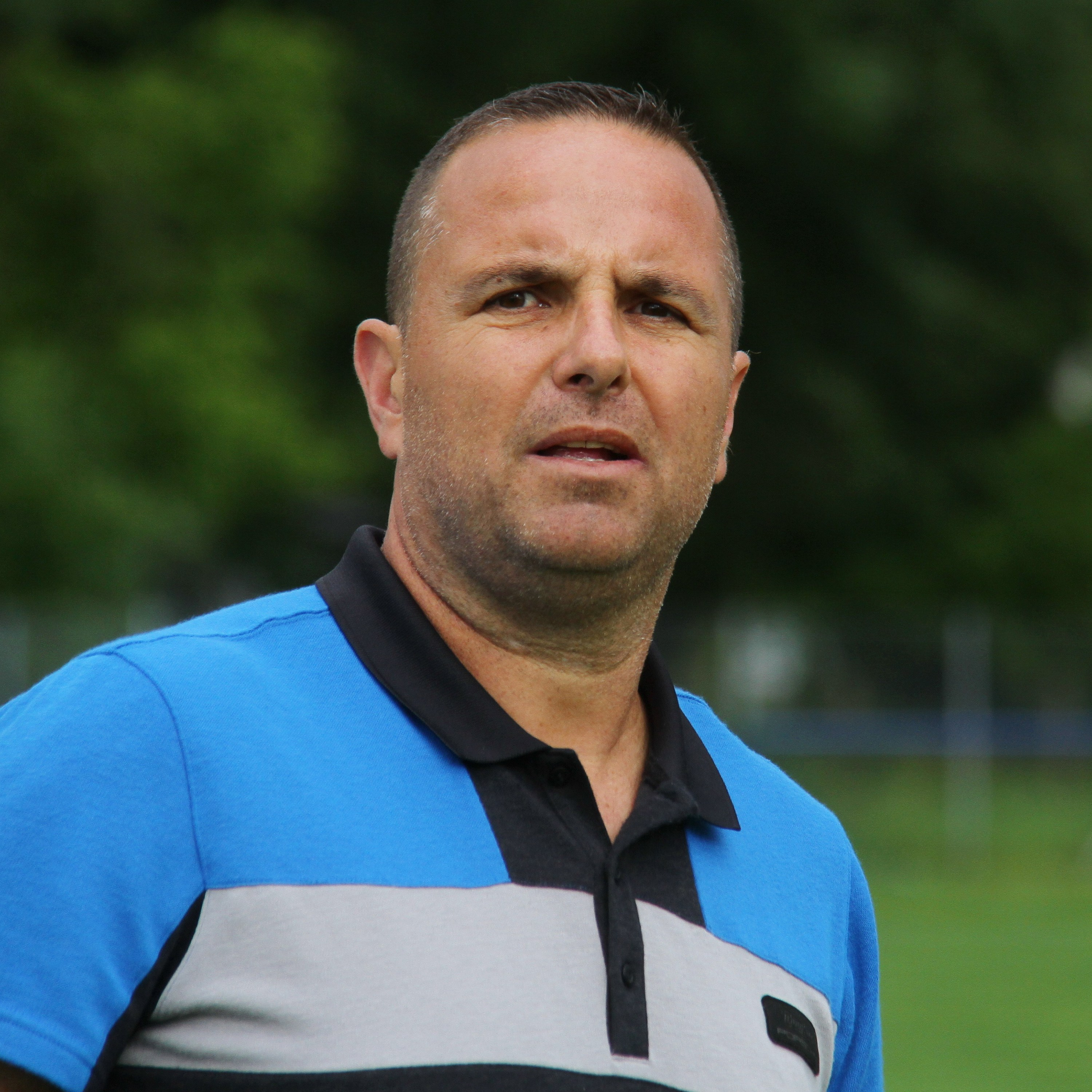
Ran Ben Shimon is the current official head coach of Israel.

As of 23 May 2024.

| Position | Name |
|---|---|
| Head coach | (Israel) Ran Ben Shimon |
| Assistant coach | (Israel) Amir Schelach |
| Assistant coach | (Israel) Gal Cohen |
| Fitness coach | (Israel) Eran Shedo |
| Fitness coach | (Israel) Matan Shoshani |
| Goalkeeping coach | (Israel) Itay Zilpa |
| Analyst | (Israel) Adar Rosenberg |
| Analyst | (Israel) Maayan Bahalul |
| Technical manager | (Israel) Roy Reinschreiber |
| Technical manager | (Israel) Avi Levi |
| Head doctor | (Israel) Ehud "Udi" Kaufman |

=== Coaching history ===
As of 6 October 2026.

| Manager | Years as manager | Pld | W | D | L | GF | GA | Win% |
|---|---|---|---|---|---|---|---|---|
| (Austria) (Israel) Egon Pollak | 1948 | 1 | 0 | 0 | 1 | 0 | 1 | 0.00 |
| (Austria) (Israel) Lajos Hess | 1949 | 3 | 1 | 0 | 2 | 5 | 12 | 33.33 |
| (Hungary) László Székely | 1950 | 2 | 1 | 0 | 1 | 7 | 4 | 50.00 |
| (Israel) Jerry Beit haLevi | 1953–54 | 5 | 0 | 0 | 5 | 1 | 7 | 0.00 |
| (England) Jackie Gibbons | 1956 | 5 | 2 | 0 | 3 | 7 | 12 | 40.00 |
| (Israel) Jerry Beit haLevi | 1957 | 1 | 0 | 0 | 1 | 4 | 5 | 0.00 |
| (Israel) Moshe Varon | 1958 | 5 | 2 | 0 | 3 | 6 | 7 | 40.00 |
| (Hungary) (Israel) Gyula Mándi | 1959–63 | 31 | 12 | 7 | 12 | 49 | 63 | 38.71 |
| (England) George Ainsley | 1963–64 | 3 | 2 | 0 | 1 | 4 | 2 | 66.67 |
| (Israel) Yosef Merimovich | 1964 | 1 | 0 | 0 | 1 | 0 | 4 | 0.00 |
| (Hungary) (Israel) Gyula Mándi | 1964 | 3 | 3 | 0 | 0 | 5 | 1 | 100.00 |
| (Israel) Yosef Merimovich | 1964–65 | 3 | 1 | 0 | 2 | 2 | 2 | 33.33 |
| (Socialist Federal Republic of Yugoslavia) Milovan Ćirić | 1965–68 | 25 | 8 | 2 | 15 | 43 | 45 | 32.00 |
| (Israel) Emmanuel Scheffer | 1968–70 | 24 | 8 | 8 | 8 | 44 | 34 | 33.33 |
| (Romania) (Israel) Edmond Schmilovich | 1970–73 | 19 | 10 | 4 | 5 | 27 | 13 | 52.63 |
| (Israel) David Schweitzer | 1973–77 | 36 | 17 | 11 | 8 | 67 | 34 | 47.22 |
| (Israel) Emmanuel Scheffer | 1978–79 | 13 | 5 | 4 | 4 | 17 | 15 | 38.46 |
| (England) Jack Mansell | 1980–81 | 10 | 2 | 3 | 5 | 8 | 12 | 20.00 |
| (Israel) Yosef Merimovich | 1983–86 | 27 | 8 | 9 | 10 | 39 | 36 | 29.63 |
| (Socialist Federal Republic of Yugoslavia) Miljenko Mihić | 1986–88 | 20 | 4 | 5 | 11 | 27 | 35 | 20.00 |
| (Israel) Itzhak Schneor (Israel) Ya'akov Grundman | 1988–92 | 18 | 5 | 5 | 8 | 21 | 30 | 27.78 |
| (Israel) Shlomo Scharf | 1992–2000 | 82 | 31 | 18 | 33 | 131 | 118 | 37.80 |
| (Denmark) Richard Møller Nielsen | 2000–02 | 20 | 7 | 4 | 9 | 29 | 33 | 35.00 |
| (Israel) Avram Grant | 2002–06 | 33 | 14 | 13 | 6 | 55 | 37 | 42.42 |
| (Israel) Dror Kashtan | 2006–10 | 31 | 15 | 10 | 6 | 51 | 30 | 48.39 |
| (Israel) Eli Ohana (caretaker) | 2010 | 1 | 1 | 0 | 0 | 2 | 0 | 100.00 |
| (Spain) (France) Luis Fernández | 2010–11 | 15 | 6 | 1 | 8 | 12 | 18 | 40.00 |
| (Israel) Eli Guttman | 2011–15 | 29 | 8 | 7 | 14 | 42 | 46 | 27.59 |
| (Israel) Alon Hazan (caretaker) | 2016 | 1 | 0 | 0 | 1 | 0 | 2 | 0.00 |
| (Israel) Elisha Levy | 2016–2017 | 10 | 4 | 1 | 5 | 11 | 15 | 40.00 |
| (Israel) Alon Hazan (caretaker) | 2018 | 1 | 0 | 0 | 1 | 1 | 2 | 0.00 |
| (Austria) Andi Herzog | 2018–2019 | 16 | 6 | 2 | 8 | 29 | 26 | 37.50 |
| (Austria) Willibald Ruttensteiner | 2020–7 February 2022 | 19 | 8 | 4 | 7 | 33 | 33 | 42.11 |
| (Israel) Gadi Brumer (caretaker) | 17 March 2022 – 29 March 2022 | 2 | 0 | 1 | 1 | 2 | 4 | 0.00 |
| (Israel) Alon Hazan | 8 May 2022 – 27 March 2024 | 17 | 7 | 5 | 5 | 26 | 24 | 41.18 |
| (Israel) Ran Ben Shimon | 23 May 2024 – present | 23 | 7 | 5 | 11 | 33 | 45 | 30.43 |

== Players ==
=== Current squad ===
The following players were called up for the 2026–27 UEFA Nations League B matches against Kosovo and Austria on 14, 17 November 2026.

Caps and goals are correct as of 17 November 2026, after the match against Austria.

| No. | Pos. | Player | Date of birth (age) | Caps | Goals | Club |
|---|---|---|---|---|---|---|
| 1 | GK | Daniel Peretz | 10 July 2000 (age 26) | 16 | 0 | (The Football Association) Southampton |
| 18 | GK | Omri Glazer | 11 March 1996 (age 30) | 23 | 0 | (Israel Football Association) Maccabi Haifa |
| 23 | GK | Assaf Tzur | 28 August 1998 (age 28) | 2 | 0 | (Israel Football Association) Hapoel Tel Aviv |
| 2 | DF | Eli Dasa | 3 December 1992 (age 33) | 83 | 1 | (Israel Football Association) Maccabi Haifa |
| 3 | DF | Roy Revivo | 22 May 2003 (age 23) | 24 | 1 | (Royal Spanish Football Federation) Elche |
| 4 | DF | Noam Shtaifman | 28 February 2008 (age 18) | 0 | 0 | (Israel Football Association) Maccabi Haifa |
| 5 | DF | Idan Nachmias | 17 March 1997 (age 29) | 23 | 0 | (Israel Football Association) Hapoel Be'er Sheva |
| 13 | DF | Nikita Stoinov | 24 August 2005 (age 21) | 8 | 0 | (Romanian Football Federation) Dinamo București |
| 14 | DF | Guy Mizrahi | 30 March 2001 (age 25) | 11 | 1 | (Israel Football Association) Hapoel Be'er Sheva |
| 22 | DF | Ilay Feingold | 23 August 2004 (age 22) | 6 | 0 | (United States Soccer Federation) New England Revolution |
| | DF | Raz Shlomo | 13 August 1999 (age 27) | 25 | 2 | (Israel Football Association) Maccabi Tel Aviv |
| 6 | MF | Omri Gandelman | 16 May 2000 (age 26) | 9 | 2 | (Italian Football Federation) Lecce |
| 8 | MF | Dor Peretz | 17 May 1995 (age 31) | 61 | 11 | (Israel Football Association) Maccabi Tel Aviv |
| 11 | MF | Oscar Gloukh | 1 April 2004 (age 22) | 35 | 5 | (Royal Dutch Football Association) Ajax |
| 15 | MF | Yarin Levi | 1 August 2005 (age 21) | 5 | 0 | (Israel Football Association) Maccabi Haifa |
| 16 | MF | Gabi Kanichowsky | 24 August 1997 (age 29) | 24 | 1 | (Israel Football Association) Maccabi Tel Aviv |
| 17 | MF | Niv Yehoshua | 28 January 2005 (age 21) | 2 | 0 | (Israel Football Association) Hapoel Be'er Sheva |
| 19 | MF | Ethan Azoulay | 26 May 2002 (age 24) | 7 | 0 | (Israel Football Association) Maccabi Haifa |
| 7 | FW | Yarden Shua | 16 June 1999 (age 27) | 11 | 2 | (Israel Football Association) Beitar Jerusalem |
| 9 | FW | Dor Turgeman | 24 October 2003 (age 23) | 24 | 2 | (United States Soccer Federation) New England Revolution |
| 10 | FW | Manor Solomon | 24 July 1999 (age 27) | 54 | 8 | (The Football Association) West Ham United |
| 12 | FW | Zahi Ahmed | 12 August 2001 (age 25) | 0 | 0 | (Israel Football Association) Hapoel Be'er Sheva |
| 20 | FW | Liel Abada | 3 October 2001 (age 25) | 22 | 1 | (United States Soccer Federation) Charlotte |
| 21 | FW | Idan Toklomati | 9 August 2004 (age 22) | 10 | 0 | (United States Soccer Federation) Charlotte |

=== Recent call-ups ===
The following players have also been called up to the Israel squad within the last twelve months.

| Pos. | Player | Date of birth (age) | Caps | Goals | Club | Latest call-up |
|---|---|---|---|---|---|---|
| GK | Niv Eliasi | 1 February 2002 (age 24) | 0 | 0 | (Greece) Levadiakos | v. Republic of Ireland, 4 October 2026 |
| DF | Anan Khalaili | 3 September 2004 (age 22) | 19 | 0 | (England) Crystal Palace | v. Kosovo, 9 November 2026^{INJ} |
| DF | Stav Lemkin | 2 April 2003 (age 23) | 10 | 0 | (Netherlands) Twente | v. Albania, 3 June 2026 |
| DF | Or Blorian | 7 March 2000 (age 26) | 5 | 0 | (United States) Sporting Kansas City | v. Albania, 3 June 2026 |
| DF | Itay Rotman | 16 August 2002 (age 24) | 1 | 0 | (Israel) Hapoel Be'er Sheva | v. Albania, 3 June 2026 |
| DF | Yarden Cohen | 26 March 1997 (age 29) | 1 | 0 | (Israel) Beitar Jerusalem | v. Georgia, 26 March 2026 |
| MF | Orian Goren | 15 March 2009 (age 17) | 0 | 0 | (Spain) Barcelona | v. Kosovo, 9 November 2026^{INJ} |
| MF | Eliel Peretz | 18 November 1996 (age 30) | 18 | 1 | (Israel) Hapoel Be'er Sheva | v. Republic of Ireland, 4 October 2026 |
| MF | Mohammad Abu Fani | 27 April 1998 (age 28) | 33 | 4 | (Serbia) Red Star Belgrade | v. Austria, 24 September 2026^{INJ} |
| MF | Neta Lavi | 25 August 1996 (age 30) | 25 | 0 | (Japan) Machida Zelvia | v. Albania, 3 June 2026 |
| MF | Stav Turiel | 14 January 2001 (age 25) | 5 | 0 | (Israel) Hapoel Tel Aviv | v. Albania, 3 June 2026 |
| MF | Ido Shahar | 20 August 2001 (age 25) | 1 | 0 | (Israel) Maccabi Tel Aviv | v. Albania, 3 June 2026 |
| MF | Tai Abed | 3 August 2004 (age 22) | 1 | 0 | (Spain) Valladolid | v. Albania, 3 June 2026 |
| MF | Itamar Noy | 28 April 2001 (age 25) | 2 | 0 | (Israel) Maccabi Tel Aviv | v. Georgia, 26 March 2026 |
| FW | Tai Baribo | January 15, 1998 (age 28) | 25 | 4 | (United States) D.C. United | v. Republic of Ireland, 4 October 2026 |
| FW | Sayed Abu Farchi | 11 May 2006 (age 20) | 2 | 1 | (United States) Colorado Rapids | v. Republic of Ireland, 4 October 2026 |
^{INJ} Withdrew due to injury or illness^{PRE} Preliminary/extended squad^{RET} Retired from the national team^{SUS} Serving suspension due to either a red card, or two accumulated yellow cards^{WD} Player withdrew from the squad due to neither injury nor illness issue^{U21} Player withdrew from the squad to play for the national under-21 team

== Records ==
As of 17 November 2026.
Players in bold are still active with Israel.
Statistics include official FIFA-recognised matches only.

=== Most capped players ===
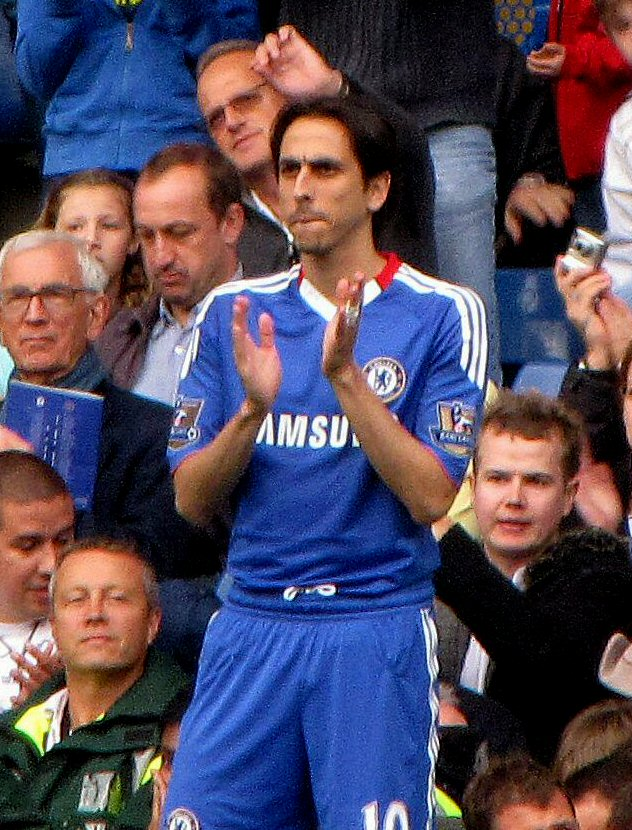
Yossi Benayoun is Israel's most capped player with 101 appearances.

| Rank | Player | Caps | Goals | Career |
|---|---|---|---|---|
| 1 | Yossi Benayoun | 101 | 23 | 1998–2017 |
| 2 | Tal Ben Haim (Note: Tal Ben Haim also played against Romania B; however, this was not a full international match and is therefore not included.) | 95 | 2 | 2002–2017 |
| 3 | Arik Benado | 94 | 0 | 1995–2007 |
| 4 | Alon Harazi | 88 | 1 | 1992–2006 |
| 4 | Bibars Natcho | 88 | 4 | 2010–2023 |
| 6 | Amir Schelach | 85 | 0 | 1992–2001 |
| 7 | **Eli Dasa** | 83 | 1 | 2015–present |
| 8 | Avi Nimni | 80 | 17 | 1992–2005 |
| 9 | Dudu Aouate | 78 | 0 | 1999–2013 |
| 9 | Eyal Berkovic | 78 | 9 | 1992–2004 |

=== Top goalscorers ===
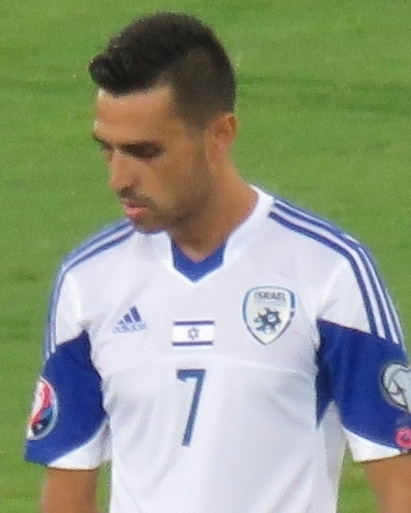
Eran Zahavi is Israel's top scorer with 35 goals.

| Rank | Player | Goals | Caps | Ratio | Career |
|---|---|---|---|---|---|
| 1 | Eran Zahavi (list) | 35 | 74 | 0.47 | 2010–2024 |
| 2 | Mordechai Spiegler (Note: Mordechai Spiegler also played in 25 matches that are not recognised by FIFA, scoring eight additional goals; however, they are not full international matches and are therefore not included.) | 24 | 57 | 0.42 | 1964–1977 |
| 3 | Ronen Harazi | 23 | 52 | 0.44 | 1992–1999 |
| 3 | Yossi Benayoun | 23 | 101 | 0.23 | 1998–2017 |
| 5 | Nahum Stelmach (Note: Nahum Stelmach also played in 19 matches that are not recognised by FIFA, scoring three additional goals; however, they are not full international matches and are therefore not included.) | 19 | 45 | 0.42 | 1956–1968 |
| 6 | Alon Mizrahi | 17 | 37 | 0.46 | 1992–2001 |
| 6 | Tomer Hemed | 17 | 38 | 0.45 | 2011–2019 |
| 6 | Eli Ohana (Note: Eli Ohana also played a 1984 Olympic qualification match; however, this was not a full international match and is therefore not included.) | 17 | 50 | 0.34 | 1984–1997 |
| 6 | Avi Nimni | 17 | 80 | 0.21 | 1992–2005 |
| 10 | Yehoshua Feigenbaum (Note: Yehoshua Feigenbaum also played in 15 matches that are not recognised by FIFA, scoring nine additional goals; however, they are not full international matches and are therefore not included.) | 15 | 36 | 0.42 | 1966–1977 |
| 10 | Mu'nas Dabbur | 15 | 40 | 0.38 | 2014–2022 |

== Competitive record ==
=== FIFA World Cup ===
| FIFA World Cup record | | | | | | | | | | Qualification record | | | | | | | |
| Year | Round | Pos | Pld | W | D | L | GF | GA | Squad | Outcome | Pld | W | D | L | GF | GA | Confederation |
| As Mandatory Palestine | | | | | | | | | | As Mandatory Palestine | | | | | | | |
| (Uruguay) 1930 | Did not enter | | | | | | | | | Did not enter | | | | | | | |
| (Italy) 1934 | Did not qualify | | | | | | | | | 2nd | 2 | 0 | 0 | 2 | 2 | 11 | Africa/Asia |
| (France) 1938 | Did not qualify | | | | | | | | | 2nd | 2 | 0 | 0 | 2 | 1 | 4 | Europe |
| As Israel | | | | | | | | | | As Israel | | | | | | | |
| (Brazil) 1950 | Did not qualify | | | | | | | | | 2nd | 2 | 0 | 0 | 2 | 2 | 11 | Europe |
| (Switzerland) 1954 | Did not qualify | | | | | | | | | 3rd | 4 | 0 | 0 | 4 | 0 | 5 | Europe |
| (Sweden) 1958 | Did not qualify | | | | | | | | | Play-off | 2 | 0 | 0 | 2 | 0 | 4 | CAF/AFC |
| (Chile) 1962 | Did not qualify | | | | | | | | | Final Round | 6 | 3 | 1 | 2 | 13 | 14 | UEFA |
| (England) 1966 | Did not qualify | | | | | | | | | 3rd | 4 | 0 | 0 | 4 | 1 | 12 | UEFA |
| (Mexico) 1970 | Group stage | 12th | 3 | 0 | 2 | 1 | 1 | 3 | Squad | Final Round | 4 | 3 | 1 | 0 | 8 | 1 | AFC/OFC |
| (West Germany) 1974 | Did not qualify | | | | | | | | | Zone A Final | 6 | 4 | 1 | 1 | 12 | 2 | AFC/OFC |
| (Argentina) 1978 | Did not qualify | | | | | | | | | First round | 4 | 2 | 1 | 1 | 5 | 3 | AFC/OFC |
| (Spain) 1982 | Did not qualify | | | | | | | | | 5th | 8 | 1 | 3 | 4 | 6 | 10 | UEFA |
| (Mexico) 1986 | Did not qualify | | | | | | | | | 2nd | 6 | 3 | 1 | 2 | 17 | 6 | OFC |
| (Italy) 1990 | Did not qualify | | | | | | | | | Play-off | 6 | 1 | 4 | 1 | 5 | 5 | OFC |
| (United States) 1994 | Did not qualify | | | | | | | | | 6th | 10 | 1 | 3 | 6 | 10 | 27 | UEFA |
| (France) 1998 | Did not qualify | | | | | | | | | 3rd | 8 | 4 | 1 | 3 | 9 | 7 | UEFA |
| (South Korea) (Japan) 2002 | Did not qualify | | | | | | | | | 3rd | 8 | 3 | 3 | 2 | 11 | 7 | UEFA |
| (Germany) 2006 | Did not qualify | | | | | | | | | 3rd | 10 | 4 | 6 | 0 | 15 | 10 | UEFA |
| (South Africa) 2010 | Did not qualify | | | | | | | | | 4th | 10 | 4 | 4 | 2 | 20 | 10 | UEFA |
| (Brazil) 2014 | Did not qualify | | | | | | | | | 3rd | 10 | 3 | 5 | 2 | 19 | 14 | UEFA |
| (Russia) 2018 | Did not qualify | | | | | | | | | 4th | 10 | 4 | 0 | 6 | 10 | 15 | UEFA |
| (Qatar) 2022 | Did not qualify | | | | | | | | | 3rd | 10 | 5 | 1 | 4 | 23 | 21 | UEFA |
| (Canada) (Mexico) (United States) 2026 | Did not qualify | | | | | | | | | 3rd | 8 | 4 | 0 | 4 | 19 | 20 | UEFA |
| (Morocco) (Portugal) (Spain) 2030 | To be determined | | | | | | | | | | | | | | | | UEFA |
| (Saudi Arabia) 2034 | To be determined | | | | | | | | | | | | | | | | UEFA |
| Total | 1/22 | Group stage | 3 | 0 | 2 | 1 | 1 | 3 | — | Final Round | 140 | 49 | 35 | 56 | 208 | 219 | — |

=== UEFA European Championship ===
| UEFA European Championship record | | | | | | | | | | Qualification record | | | | | | |
| Year | Round | Pos | Pld | W | D | L | GF | GA | Squad | Outcome | Pld | W | D | L | GF | GA |
| 1960–1992 | Not a UEFA member | | | | | | | | | Not a UEFA member | | | | | | |
| (England) 1996 | Did not qualify | | | | | | | | | 5th | 10 | 3 | 3 | 4 | 13 | 13 |
| (Belgium) (Netherlands) 2000 | Did not qualify | | | | | | | | | Play-offs | 8 | 4 | 1 | 3 | 25 | 9 |
| (Portugal) 2004 | Did not qualify | | | | | | | | | 3rd | 8 | 2 | 3 | 3 | 9 | 11 |
| (Austria) (Switzerland) 2008 | Did not qualify | | | | | | | | | 4th | 12 | 7 | 2 | 3 | 20 | 12 |
| (Poland) (Ukraine) 2012 | Did not qualify | | | | | | | | | 3rd | 10 | 5 | 1 | 4 | 13 | 11 |
| (France) 2016 | Did not qualify | | | | | | | | | 4th | 10 | 4 | 1 | 5 | 16 | 14 |
| (Europe) 2020 | Did not qualify | | | | | | | | | Play-offs | 11 | 3 | 3 | 5 | 16 | 18 |
| (Germany) 2024 | Did not qualify | | | | | | | | | Play-offs | 11 | 4 | 3 | 4 | 12 | 15 |
| (England) (Scotland) (Republic of Ireland) (Wales) 2028 | To be determined | | | | | | | | | To be determined | | | | | | |
| (Italy) (Turkey) 2032 | To be determined | | | | | | | | | To be determined | | | | | | |
| Total | — | | | | | | | | | Play-offs | 80 | 32 | 17 | 31 | 124 | 103 |

=== UEFA Nations League ===
UEFA Nations League record
| League phase | | | | | | | | | | | | Finals | | | | | | | | |
| Season | LG | Grp | Pos | Pld | W | D | L | GF | GA | P/R | RK | Year | Pos | Pld | W | D* | L | GF | GA | Squad |
| 2018–19 | C | 1 | 2nd | 4 | 2 | 0 | 2 | 6 | 5 | ▲ | 30th | (Portugal) 2019 | Did not qualify | | | | | | | |
| 2020–21 | B | 2 | 2nd | 6 | 2 | 2 | 2 | 7 | 7 | Same position | 25th | (Italy) 2021 | Did not qualify | | | | | | | |
| 2022–23 | B | 2 | 1st | 4 | 2 | 2 | 0 | 8 | 6 | ▲ | 17th | (Netherlands) 2023 | Did not qualify | | | | | | | |
| 2024–25 | A | 2 | 4th | 6 | 1 | 1 | 4 | 5 | 13 | ▼ | 14th | (Germany) 2025 | Did not qualify | | | | | | | |
| 2026–27 | B | 3 | 4th | 6 | 0 | 4 | 2 | 3 | 8 | TBD | 29th | 2027 | Did not qualify | | | | | | | |
| 2026–27 | B | Relegation play-off | TBD | 0 | 0 | 0 | 0 | 0 | 0 | TBD | 29th | 2027 | Did not qualify | | | | | | | |
| Total | | | | 26 | 7 | 9 | 10 | 29 | 39 | 14th | | Total | — | | | | | | | |

*Denotes draws including knockout matches decided via penalty shoot-out.
**Group stage played home and away. Flag shown represents host nation for the finals stage.

=== Olympic Games ===
Olympic Games record
| Year | Round | Position | Pld | W | D | L | GF | GA | Squad |
|---|---|---|---|---|---|---|---|---|---|
| (Finland) 1952 | Did not enter | | | | | | | | |
| (Australia) 1956 | Did not enter | | | | | | | | |
| (Italy) 1960 | Did not qualify | | | | | | | | |
| (Japan) 1964 | Did not qualify | | | | | | | | |
| (Mexico) 1968 | Quarter-finals | 5th | 4 | 2 | 1 | 1 | 9 | 7 | Squad |
| (West Germany) 1972 | Did not qualify | | | | | | | | |
| (Canada) 1976 | Quarter-finals | 6th | 4 | 0 | 3 | 1 | 4 | 7 | Squad |
| (Soviet Union) 1980 | Withdrew | | | | | | | | |
| (United States) 1984 | Did not qualify | | | | | | | | |
| (South Korea) 1988 | Did not qualify | | | | | | | | |
| 1992–present | Competition played as an Under-23 competition | | | | | | | | |
| Total | Quarter-finals | 2/10 | 8 | 2 | 4 | 2 | 13 | 14 | — |

=== AFC Asian Cup ===
AFC Asian Cup record
| Year | Position | Pld | W | D | L | GF | GA | Squad |
|---|---|---|---|---|---|---|---|---|
| (Hong Kong) 1956 | Runners-up | 3 | 2 | 0 | 1 | 6 | 5 | Squad |
| (South Korea) 1960 | Runners-up | 3 | 2 | 0 | 1 | 6 | 4 | Squad |
| (Israel) 1964 | Champions | 3 | 3 | 0 | 0 | 5 | 1 | Squad |
| (Iran) 1968 | Third place | 4 | 2 | 0 | 2 | 11 | 5 | Squad |
| (Thailand) 1972 | Withdrew+ | | | | | | | |
| Total | 1 Title | 13 | 9 | 0 | 4 | 28 | 15 | — |

+ Israel qualified as hosts but later withdrew. Thailand replaced them later.

- Gold background colour indicates that the tournament was won.
- Red border color indicates tournament was held on home soil.

=== Asian Games ===
Asian Games record
| Year | Round | Pld | W | D | L | GF | GA | Squad |
|---|---|---|---|---|---|---|---|---|
| (India) 1951 | Did not enter | | | | | | | |
| (Philippines) 1954 | Did not enter | | | | | | | |
| (Japan) 1958 | Quarter-finals | 3 | 2 | 0 | 1 | 6 | 3 | Squad |
| (Indonesia) 1962 | Did not enter | | | | | | | |
| (Thailand) 1966 | Did not enter | | | | | | | |
| (Thailand) 1970 | Did not enter | | | | | | | |
| (Iran) 1974 | Runners-up | 7 | 6 | 0 | 1 | 24 | 4 | Squad |
| Total | 2/13 | 10 | 8 | 0 | 2 | 30 | 7 | – |

== Head-to-head record ==
As of 4 October 2026

Positive record Neutral record Negative record

| Opponents | Pld | W | D | L |
|---|---|---|---|---|
| Albania | 7 | 5 | 0 | 2 |
| Andorra | 6 | 6 | 0 | 0 |
| Argentina | 5 | 1 | 1 | 3 |
| Armenia | 1 | 1 | 0 | 0 |
| Australia | 17 | 3 | 9 | 5 |
| Austria | 14 | 3 | 4 | 7 |
| Azerbaijan | 5 | 3 | 2 | 0 |
| Belarus | 8 | 6 | 0 | 2 |
| Belgium | 9 | 2 | 0 | 7 |
| Bosnia and Herzegovina | 4 | 2 | 1 | 1 |
| Brazil | 3 | 0 | 0 | 3 |
| Bulgaria | 7 | 1 | 2 | 4 |
| Cameroon | 3 | 0 | 2 | 1 |
| Canada | 6 | 6 | 0 | 0 |
| Chile | 2 | 1 | 0 | 1 |
| Chinese Taipei | 7 | 6 | 0 | 1 |
| Colombia | 2 | 0 | 1 | 1 |
| Costa Rica | 3 | 3 | 0 | 0 |
| Croatia | 9 | 0 | 1 | 8 |
| Cyprus | 16 | 9 | 3 | 4 |
| Czech Republic | 4 | 0 | 0 | 4 |
| Denmark | 10 | 1 | 0 | 9 |
| Egypt | 2 | 0 | 0 | 2 |
| El Salvador | 1 | 1 | 0 | 0 |
| England | 4 | 0 | 2 | 2 |
| Estonia | 5 | 5 | 0 | 0 |
| Ethiopia | 4 | 4 | 0 | 0 |
| Faroe Islands | 5 | 4 | 1 | 0 |
| Finland | 5 | 2 | 1 | 2 |
| France | 11 | 1 | 5 | 5 |
| Georgia | 7 | 3 | 3 | 1 |
| Germany (Note: Includes matches against West Germany.) | 5 | 0 | 0 | 5 |
| Ghana | 1 | 1 | 0 | 0 |
| Greece | 19 | 3 | 5 | 11 |
| Guatemala | 2 | 1 | 1 | 0 |
| Honduras | 2 | 2 | 0 | 0 |
| Hong Kong | 3 | 3 | 0 | 0 |
| Hungary | 6 | 2 | 2 | 2 |
| Iceland | 6 | 2 | 3 | 1 |
| India | 4 | 4 | 0 | 0 |
| Indonesia | 1 | 1 | 0 | 0 |
| Iran | 5 | 1 | 1 | 3 |
| Italy | 9 | 0 | 1 | 8 |
| Ivory Coast | 2 | 0 | 1 | 1 |
| Japan | 7 | 7 | 0 | 0 |
| Kosovo | 3 | 0 | 2 | 1 |
| Latvia | 7 | 5 | 1 | 1 |
| Lebanon | 1 | 1 | 0 | 0 |
| Liechtenstein | 4 | 4 | 0 | 0 |
| Lithuania | 6 | 4 | 2 | 0 |
| Luxembourg | 9 | 9 | 0 | 0 |
| Malaysia | 2 | 2 | 0 | 0 |
| Malta | 9 | 6 | 2 | 1 |
| Mexico | 2 | 1 | 0 | 1 |
| Moldova | 10 | 7 | 3 | 0 |
| Montenegro | 1 | 1 | 0 | 0 |
| Myanmar | 2 | 1 | 0 | 1 |
| Netherlands | 4 | 0 | 0 | 4 |
| New Zealand | 8 | 6 | 1 | 1 |
| North Macedonia | 7 | 4 | 1 | 2 |
| Northern Ireland | 10 | 1 | 5 | 4 |
| Norway | 4 | 1 | 0 | 3 |
| Pakistan | 2 | 1 | 1 | 0 |
| Philippines | 1 | 1 | 0 | 0 |
| Poland | 11 | 2 | 4 | 5 |
| Portugal | 7 | 1 | 2 | 4 |
| Republic of Ireland | 7 | 1 | 4 | 2 |
| Romania | 24 | 5 | 7 | 12 |
| Russia (Note: Includes matches against the Soviet Union.) | 14 | 4 | 3 | 7 |
| San Marino | 2 | 2 | 0 | 0 |
| Scotland | 11 | 2 | 3 | 6 |
| Serbia (Note: Includes matches against Yugoslavia and Serbia and Montenegro.) | 12 | 3 | 1 | 8 |
| Singapore | 1 | 1 | 0 | 0 |
| Slovakia | 8 | 3 | 2 | 3 |
| Slovenia | 4 | 0 | 3 | 1 |
| South Africa | 1 | 0 | 0 | 1 |
| South Korea | 11 | 2 | 4 | 5 |
| Spain | 6 | 0 | 1 | 5 |
| Sri Lanka | 3 | 3 | 0 | 0 |
| Sweden | 12 | 1 | 4 | 7 |
| Switzerland | 9 | 1 | 5 | 3 |
| Thailand | 3 | 1 | 2 | 0 |
| Turkey | 6 | 2 | 0 | 4 |
| Ukraine | 6 | 1 | 3 | 2 |
| United States | 6 | 3 | 1 | 2 |
| Uruguay | 6 | 1 | 1 | 4 |
| Uzbekistan | 1 | 1 | 0 | 0 |
| Vietnam (Note: As South Vietnam.) | 4 | 3 | 0 | 1 |
| Wales | 6 | 0 | 3 | 3 |
| Zambia | 1 | 1 | 0 | 0 |

== FIFA World Ranking history ==
As of April 2025, Israel ranked 78th in the FIFA Men's World Ranking; its highest ever ranking was 15th and lowest was 99th, with an average ranking of 53rd.

== Honours ==
=== Continental ===
- AFC Asian Cup
  - (gold) Champions (1): 1964
  - (silver) Runners-up (2): 1956, 1960
  - (bronze) Third place (1): 1968
- Asian Games^{1}
  - (silver) Silver Medal (1): 1974

=== Summary ===
| Competition | 1st place, gold medalist(s) | 2nd place, silver medalist(s) | 3rd place, bronze medalist(s) | Total |
|---|---|---|---|---|
| AFC Asian Cup | 1 | 2 | 1 | 4 |
| Total | 1 | 2 | 1 | 4 |

Notes

1. Competition organized by OCA, officially not recognized by FIFA.

== See also ==
- UEFA European Football Championship
- Israel women's national football team
- Israel national under-23 football team
- Israel national under-21 football team
- Israel national under-20 football team
- Israel national under-19 football team
- Israel national under-18 football team
- Israel national under-17 football team
- Israel national under-16 football team
- Football in Israel
- Sports in Israel
- Israeli Premier League
