= 1962 FIFA World Cup qualification – UEFA Group 7 =

Football tournament

The five teams (four of them played with Romania withdrawing) in this group played in a knockout stage on a home-and-away basis. The winner (Italy) qualified for the seventh FIFA World Cup held in Chile. This was a special group which included two UEFA countries located geographically in Asia (Cyprus and Israel) and one CAF country located in Africa (Ethiopia), in addition to two European UEFA teams (Romania who withdrew without playing any games, and Italy who won the group.)

== Matches ==
First Round
Israel	1	6	7
Cyprus	1	1	2

Second Round
Italy	w/o
Romania (withdrew)
Ethiopia	0	2	2
Israel	1	3	4

Final Round
Italy	4	6	10
Israel	2	0	2

=== First round ===
13 November 1960

Cyprus	1–1	Israel
Yasemis 29'	Report	Kofman 31'

GSP Stadium, Nicosia
Attendance: 11,000
Referee: Bajić (Yugoslavia)

27 November 1960

Israel	6–1	Cyprus
Levi 14', 30', 66'; Stelmach 61', 88'; Nahari 34'	Report	Yasemis 89' (pen.)

Ramat Gan Stadium, Tel Aviv
Attendance: 45,000
Referee: Bajić (Yugoslavia)

Israel win 7–2 on aggregate.

=== Second round ===
The Addis Ababa Stadium was being renovated in preparation for the 1962 African Cup of Nations, so Ethiopia lacked a suitable home venue, and agreed to play both games in Israel.

14 March 1961

Israel	1–0	Ethiopia
Glazer 69'	Report

Ramat Gan Stadium, Tel Aviv
Attendance: 35,000
Referee: Zsolt (Hungary)

19 March 1961

Israel	3–2	Ethiopia
Glazer 27', 77'; Stelmach 59'	Report	Awad 31'; Vassalo 64'

Ramat Gan Stadium, Tel Aviv
Attendance: 30,000
Referee: Pósa József (Hungary)

Israel win 4–2 on aggregate.

=== Final round ===
15 October 1961

Israel	2–4	Italy
Stelmach 15'; Young 38'	Report	Lojacono 53' (pen.); Altafini 79'; Corso 87', 90'

Ramat Gan Stadium, Tel Aviv
Attendance: 50,000
Referee: Takow (Bulgaria)

4 November 1961

Italy	6–0	Israel
Sivori 16', 52', 65', 88'; Corso 59'; Angelillo 69'	Report

Stadio Comunale, Turin
Attendance: 70,000
Referee: Asensi Martin (Spain)

Italy win 10–2 on aggregate.
