= Mandatory Palestine national football team =

National football team, 1934–1948

Mandatory Palestine
1934–1940
- Nickname(s): Eretz Israel (Land of Israel)
- Association: Palestine Football Association (PFA)
- Head coach: Shimon Ratner (1934 WCQ); Egon Pollak (1938 WCQ); Arthur Baar (1940 friendly)
- Captain: Avraham Reznik (1934–1938); Pinhas Fiedler (1934); Gdalyahu Fuchs (1938); Werner Kaspi (1940)
- Most caps: Gdalyahu Fuchs (4)
- Top scorer: Werner Kaspi (2)
- Home stadium: Palms Ground; Maccabi Ground; Maccabiah Stadium
- FIFA code: PAL
First colours

First international
- Egypt 7–1 Mandatory Palestine (Cairo, Egypt; 16 March 1934)

Last international
- Mandatory Palestine 5–1 Lebanon (Tel Aviv, Mandatory Palestine; 27 April 1940)

Biggest win
- Mandatory Palestine 5–1 Lebanon (Tel Aviv, Mandatory Palestine; 27 April 1940)

Biggest defeat
- Egypt 7–1 Mandatory Palestine (Cairo, Egypt; 16 March 1934)

The Mandatory Palestine national football team, also known as the Eretz Israel national football team (Hebrew: נבחרת ארץ ישראל בכדורגל), represented the British Mandate of Palestine in international football competitions, and was managed by the Palestine Football Association.

Football was introduced to Palestine by the British military during World War I and further developed by European Jewish immigrants. In 1928, Yosef Yekutieli, a leader of the Maccabi World Union, founded the Palestine Football Association. It achieved FIFA membership in 1929, despite in practice being an almost exclusively Jewish organisation at a time when Jews represented a minority of the country's population. In 1934 all Arabs involved in the organisation left due to a lack of representation and founded the "Palestinian Arab Sports Federation" later "Arab Palestine Sports Federation" (APSF).

The team used to play in the Maccabiah Stadium, Maccabi Ground and Palms Ground, all three located in Tel Aviv. Mandatory Palestine played five official games (four FIFA World Cup qualifiers, and one friendly), before it officially became the national team of Israel in 1948.

== History ==
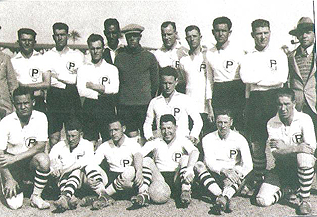
Mandatory Palestine during its tour in Egypt in 1931

Football was introduced to Palestine by the British military during its occupation of the territory in World War I. After the war, the sport's development was continued primarily by European Jews who had been exposed to football in their native countries. In August 1928, Yosef Yekutieli, a leader of the Jewish sports organization Maccabi World Union, founded the Palestine Football Association (PFA). The PFA was accepted into FIFA on 6 June 1929, following an application by the Jewish Maccabi World Union. It became the first of 14 sports organisations in Palestine to gain international recognition and served as a hub for hundreds of leading sportsmen who immigrated to the region in the wake of rising antisemitism in Europe.

By FIFA rules, the association was required to represent the entire population of Palestine. However, in practice, the PFA was dominated by Jewish players and executives, despite Palestinian Arabs constituting the majority of the population. According to Issam Khalidi, the Jewish leadership of the PFA systematically limited Arab participation by ensuring Jewish clubs formed the majority of its membership, imposing Hebrew as the primary language for official communication, and incorporating the Zionist flag into its logo. These actions alienated Arab clubs, who felt marginalized and excluded from the decision-making processes of the PFA.

In 1934, the Arab clubs formally left the PFA to form the General Palestinian Sports Association, citing grievances such as the lack of representation, the imposition of Hebrew, and the scheduling of games on Saturdays, which conflicted with Arab customs. The Palestine Sports Federation, established in 1938, later submitted a memorandum to FIFA in 1946, requesting separate recognition due to the irreconcilable political and social divisions between Arab and Jewish communities in Mandatory Palestine. The memorandum highlighted the deep-seated tensions and the inability of the two communities to cooperate in sports under the existing framework.

Mandatory Palestine played five international games (two games in the 1934 FIFA World Cup qualification, two games in the 1938 FIFA World Cup qualification, and a friendly game against Lebanon) before the end of the British Mandate in 1948. During those five games, the national team fielded only Jewish players. Before each match, three anthems were played: the British "God Save the King", the Jewish (and future Israeli) "Hatikvah" and the opposing team's anthem. In 1948, following the establishment of the State of Israel, the team officially became the national team of Israel.

== Results ==
16 March 1934 1934 FIFA World Cup qualification	Egypt	7–1	Mandatory Palestine	Cairo, Egypt
	Mokhtar 11', 35', 51'; Taha 21', 79'; Latif 43', 87'	Report	Nudelman 61'	Stadium: British Army Ground; Attendance: 13,000; Referee: Stanley Wells (England)

6 April 1934 1934 FIFA World Cup qualification	Mandatory Palestine	1–4	Egypt	Tel Aviv, Mandatory Palestine
	Sukenik 54'	Report	Latif 2'; Mokhtar 7', 22'; Fawzi 35'	Stadium: Palms Ground; Attendance: 8,000; Referee: Frederick John Goodsby (England)

22 January 1938 1938 FIFA World Cup qualification	Mandatory Palestine	1–3	Greece	Tel Aviv, Mandatory Palestine
	Neufeld 36'	Report	Vikelidis 15', 30'; Migiakis 73'	Stadium: Maccabi Ground; Attendance: 8,000; Referee: Mohammed Youssef (Egypt)

20 February 1938 1938 FIFA World Cup qualification	Greece	1–0	Mandatory Palestine	Athens, Greece
	Vikelidis 88' (pen.)	Report		Stadium: Stadio Leoforos Alexandras; Attendance: 12,000; Referee: Mika Popović (Yugoslavia)

27 April 1940 Friendly	Mandatory Palestine	5–1	Lebanon	Tel Aviv, Mandatory Palestine
16:00 UTC+3	Meitner 2'; Schneiderovitz 11' (pen.); Machlis 32'; Kaspi 40', 60'	Report	Cordahi 50'	Stadium: Maccabiah Stadium; Attendance: 10,000; Referee: John Blackwell (England)

== Players ==
=== 1934 FIFA World Cup qualification ===
Coaches: (Austria) Egon Pollak and (Poland) Shimon Ratner

No.	Pos.	Player	Date of birth (age)	Club
	GK	Willy Berger	17 January 1906 (aged 28)	(Israel Football Association) Hapoel Tel Aviv
	DF	Pinhas Fiedler	24 March 1911 (aged 22)	(Israel Football Association) Maccabi Hashmonayim
	DF	Avraham Reznik (Captain)		(Israel Football Association) Maccabi Tel Aviv
	DF	David Weinberg	1 January 1910 (aged 24)	(Israel Football Association) Maccabi Tel Aviv
	MF	Zalman Friedmann	1 January 1912 (aged 22)	(Israel Football Association) Hapoel Tel Aviv
	MF	Gdalyahu Fuchs	11 March 1911 (aged 23)	(Israel Football Association) Hapoel Haifa
	MF	Paul Kastenbaum	3 December 1909 (aged 24)	(Israel Football Association) Hapoel Tel Aviv
	MF	Perry Kraus		(Israel Football Association) Hapoel Tel Aviv
	MF	Haim Reich	9 April 1911 (aged 22)	(Israel Football Association) Maccabi Tel Aviv
	MF	Yohanan Sukenik	1 January 1909 (aged 25)	(Israel Football Association) Hapoel Tel Aviv
	FW	Amnon Harlap	13 December 1909 (aged 24)	(Israel Football Association) Hapoel Tel Aviv
	FW	Avraham Nudelman	5 October 1910 (aged 23)	(Israel Football Association) Hapoel Tel Aviv
	FW	Yaacov Zelibanski		(Israel Football Association) Maccabi Tel Aviv
	FW	Yaacov Levi-Meir	29 August 1908 (aged 25)	(Israel Football Association) Maccabi Hashmonayim

=== 1938 FIFA World Cup qualification ===
Coach: (Austria) Egon Pollak

No.	Pos.	Player	Date of birth (age)	Club
1	GK	Julius Klein	13 September 1909 (aged 28)	(Israel Football Association) Hapoel Haifa
1	GK	Israel Elsner	31 August 1909 (aged 28)	(Israel Football Association) Maccabi Tel Aviv
2	DF	Avraham Beit haLevi	13 May 1913 (aged 24)	(Israel Football Association) Hapoel Tel Aviv
3	DF	Avraham Reznik (Captain)		(Israel Football Association) Maccabi Tel Aviv
4	MF	Yosef Libermann	13 August 1909 (aged 28)	(Israel Football Association) Maccabi Tel Aviv
5	MF	Gdalyahu Fuchs	11 March 1911 (aged 26)	(Israel Football Association) Hapoel Haifa
5	MF	Yohanan Sukenik	1 January 1909 (aged 29)	(Israel Football Association) Hapoel Tel Aviv
6	MF	Menahem Mirmovich		(Israel Football Association) Maccabi Tel Aviv
7	FW	Mila Ginzburg	2 November 1918 (aged 19)	(Israel Football Association) Maccabi Tel Aviv
8	FW	Shuka Brashedski	2 February 1914 (aged 23)	(Israel Football Association) Hapoel Haifa
8	FW	Yona Stern		(Israel Football Association) Hapoel Haifa
9	FW	Peri Neufeld	1 July 1913 (aged 24)	(Israel Football Association) Maccabi Tel Aviv
10	FW	Jerry Beit haLevi	14 November 1912 (aged 25)	(Israel Football Association) Maccabi Tel Aviv
10	FW	Gaul Machlis	21 May 1918 (aged 19)	(Israel Football Association) Maccabi Tel Aviv
11	FW	Avraham Nudelman	5 October 1910 (aged 27)	(Israel Football Association) Hapoel Tel Aviv
11	FW	Natan Panz	28 September 1917 (aged 20)	(Israel Football Association) Maccabi Tel Aviv

=== 1940 friendly ===
Coach: (Austria) Arthur Baar

No.	Pos.	Player	Date of birth (age)	Club
	GK	Binyamin Mizrahi	11 November 1916 (aged 23)	(Israel Football Association) Beitar Tel Aviv
	GK	Asi Asher		(Israel Football Association) Hakoah Tel Aviv
	DF	Shalom Shalomzon	27 September 1919 (aged 20)	(Israel Football Association) Maccabi Tel Aviv
	DF	Yaacov Breir	9 May 1910 (aged 29)	(Israel Football Association) Hapoel Haifa
	DF	Lonia Dvorin	23 October 1917 (aged 22)	(Israel Football Association) Beitar Tel Aviv
	MF	Zalman Friedmann	1 January 1912 (aged 28)	(Israel Football Association) Hapoel Tel Aviv
	MF	Zvi Fuchs	12 April 1917 (aged 23)	(Israel Football Association) Maccabi Tel Aviv
	MF	Haim Reich	9 April 1911 (aged 29)	(Israel Football Association) Hapoel Tel Aviv
	FW	Herbert Meitner	30 May 1914 (aged 25)	(Israel Football Association) Hapoel Rishon
	FW	Zvi Erlich	7 November 1909 (aged 30)	(Israel Football Association) Hapoel Tel Aviv
	FW	Werner Kaspi (Captain)	12 July 1917 (aged 22)	(Israel Football Association) Beitar Tel Aviv
	FW	Avraham Schneiderowitz	1 December 1916 (aged 23)	(Israel Football Association) Maccabi Nes Tziona
	FW	Gaul Machlis	21 May 1918 (aged 21)	(Israel Football Association) Maccabi Tel Aviv
	FW	Peri Neufeld	1 July 1913 (aged 26)	(Israel Football Association) Maccabi Tel Aviv

== FIFA World Cup record ==
Mandatory Palestine's FIFA World Cup record										Qualification record						
Host(s) and year	Round	Pos	Pld	W	D	L	GF	GA	Squad	Outcome	Pld	W	D	L	GF	GA
(Uruguay) 1930	did not participate									did not participate						
(Italy) 1934	did not qualify									2nd of 2	2	0	0	2	2	11
(France) 1938	did not qualify									2nd of 2	2	0	0	2	1	4
1950–present	see Israel national football team									see Israel national football team						
Total	Best: N/A	0/3	0	0	0	0	0	0	—	Total	4	0	0	4	3	15

== See also ==
- Football in Israel
- History of the Israel national football team
- Israel national football team
- Palestine national football team

== Bibliography ==
- Henshaw, Richard (1979). The Encyclopedia of World Soccer. Washington, D.C.: New Republic Books. ISBN 0-915220-34-2.
- Sorek, Tamir (2003). "Palestinian Nationalism Has Left the Field: A Shortened History of Arab Soccer in Israel". International Journal of Middle East Studies. 35 (3): 417–437. doi:10.1017/S0020743803000175. JSTOR 3880202. S2CID 143912280.
