= Haim Reich =

Israeli footballer & manager (1911–1965)

Haim Reich חיים רייך
Personal information
- Date of birth: 9 April 1911
- Date of death: 23 January 1965 (aged 53)
- Position: Midfielder

Senior career*
Years	Team	Apps	(Gls)
1934	Maccabi Tel Aviv		
1939	Beitar Tel Aviv		
1940	Hapoel Tel Aviv		

International career
1934–1940	Mandatory Palestine	3	(0)

Managerial career
- 1939: Hapoel Ramat Gan Givatayim
- 1946: Hapoel Ramat Gan Givatayim
- 1951–1954: Hapoel Kfar Saba
- 1954–1955: Beitar Tel Aviv
- 1955–1956: Hapoel Ramat Gan Givatayim
- * Club domestic league appearances and goals

Haim Reich (Hebrew: חיים רייך; 9 April 1911 – 23 January 1965) was a football player who played on teams and internationally in Mandatory Palestine, and manager for teams in the region before and after independence as Israel in 1948. As a player, he played as a midfielder for Maccabi Tel Aviv, Beitar Tel Aviv, Hapoel Tel Aviv, and the Mandatory Palestine national team.

Reich represented Mandatory Palestine in both their first and last international match, respectively against Egypt in 1934 and Lebanon in 1940; he made three official international caps.
