= Maccabi Ground, Tel Aviv =

Former football ground in Tel Aviv, Israel

Maccabi Ground
- Interactive map of Maccabi Ground
- Location: Tel Aviv, Israel
- Coordinates: 32°3′20.5″N 34°46′52.7″E

Construction
- Opened: 1926
- Closed: 1944

Tenants
- Maccabi Tel Aviv (1926-1935); Bnei Yehuda Tel Aviv (1936–1944)

Maccabi Ground (Hebrew: מגרש מכבי or Hebrew: מגרש המכבי), was a football ground in south-east Tel Aviv, near Neve Sha'anan and Shapira neighborhoods of Tel Aviv, Israel. The ground was in use between 1926 and 1944 and was abandoned when it was built over.

== History ==
The ground was opened in 1926, when Maccabi Tel Aviv moved into the ground from their previous ground, as their lease expired, playing there until moving to the Maccabiah Stadium in 1935. In 1936, after the establishment of Bnei Yehuda, the team took over the ground and established its headquarters there. Other minor clubs, such as Shushan Tel Aviv and HaTehiya Tel Aviv also took advantage of the available pitch and hosted matches there in the early 1940.

In 1944, Bnei Yehuda had to abandon the pitch and move to a Bnei Yehuda Ground, which was built on the other side of the Ayalon River.

== See also ==
- Sports in Israel
