= Egon Pollak =

Austrian-Israeli footballer

Gitschi Pollak
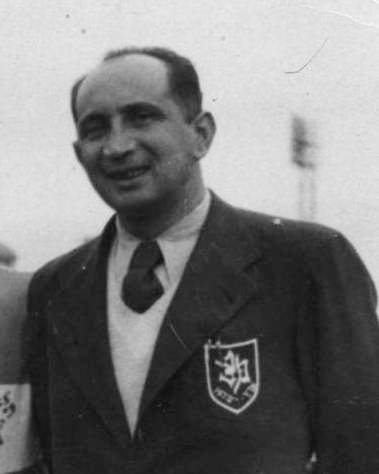
- Egon Pollak in 1939

Personal information
- Full name: Egon Erwin Pollak
- Date of birth: 12 November 1898
- Place of birth: Vienna, Austria
- Date of death: 21 January 1981 (aged 82)
- Place of death: Germany
- Position: Fullback

Senior career*
Years	Team	Apps	(Gls)
- Hakoah Wien
1926–1927	New York Giants	19	(0)

International career
1924	Austria	1	(0)

Managerial career
- 1934: Maccabi Tel Aviv
- 1938: Mandatory Palestine
- 1941: Maccabi Rishon LeZion
- 1948: Israel
- * Club domestic league appearances and goals

Gustav "Egon" or "Erwin" Pollak (Hebrew: אגון פולק, 12 November 1898 – 21 January 1981) was an Austrian-born footballer who played for the famed SC Hakoah Wien (a.k.a. Hakoah Vienna). He was also the first ever manager of the Israel national football team in their 3–1 loss to the United States just after gaining independence.

== Early life ==
Egon Erwin Pollak was born in Vienna, Austria, to a Jewish family.

== Club career ==
Pollak began his career with SC Hakoah Wien in the Austrian League. In 1926, he moved to the United States where he played a single season with the New York Giants of the American Soccer League.
