= Jerry Beit haLevi =

Israeli footballer and manager

Jerry Beit haLevi ג'רי בית הלוי
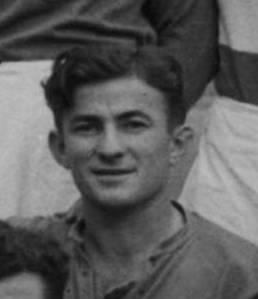
- Beit haLevi in 1939

Personal information
- Full name: Moshe Beit haLevi
- Date of birth: 14 November 1912
- Place of birth: Łódź, Congress Poland
- Date of death: 3 February 1997 (aged 84)
- Position: Midfielder

Senior career*
Years	Team	Apps	(Gls)
1927–1943	Maccabi Tel Aviv		

International career
1938	Mandatory Palestine	1	(0)

Managerial career
- 1947–1952: Maccabi Tel Aviv
- 1952–1953: Hapoel Tel Aviv
- 1953–1958: Maccabi Tel Aviv
- 1953–1954: Israel
- 1958–1960: Maccabi Netanya
- 1957: Israel
- 1960–1961: Nigeria
- 1962–1964: Maccabi Tel Aviv
- * Club domestic league appearances and goals

Moshe "Jerry" Beit haLevi (Hebrew: ג'רי בית הלוי; 14 November 1912 – 3 February 1997) was an Israeli football player and manager.

== Playing career ==
In 1939, during a tour of Australia, Jerry's brother Avraham decided to stay in the country and it was the last time Jerry would see him, who ended up dying in battle against Japanese forces in New Guinea.

== Managerial career ==
=== Maccabi Tel Aviv and Israel ===
After the retirement of Egon Pollack, Beit haLevi took over the reins of the club that made him famous as a player. He built a strong side that was arguably the strongest side in the country. Star players Eli Fuchs, Itzhak Schneor and Shiye Glazer and tough tactics helped Beit haLevi capture two league championships in 1951 and 1952 as well as a double in 1954. He left Maccabi for a brief stint at city rivals Hapoel Tel Aviv before bringing Maccabi another league title in 1956.

During his time with Maccabi, Beit haLevi served two terms as manager of the Israel national team. His bunker tactics led to the national team's style of play being referred to as "Jerry's bunker". After the 1956 season with Maccabi, Beit haLevi was fired, though he returned in the 1960s and is credited with the development of such national team stars such as Giora Spiegel. After retiring from coaching, he served as the chairman for the club.

=== Nigeria national team ===
In 1960, Jerry received an offer to coach the Nigerian national football team, which he accepted. In his first match against Ghana, Nigeria lost 3–0 in Lagos. The press called for Beit haLevi to be fired, but members of the Nigeria Football Association (NFA) pushed back against the exceedingly harsh criticism from the press, and Jerry remained in his position.

In November, Jerry recorded his first achievement as Nigeria beat Egypt 2–1. In April 1961, the Israeli coach led the national team to two draws against Ghana. The positive relationship with sportswriters translated into positive coverage of Jerry in most of the Nigerian press from this time onward.

At the end of 1961, Nigeria played against Tunisia in qualifiers for the 1962 Africa Cup of Nations. The first of the two games took place in Lagos on 25 November, ending in a 2–1 victory for the Green Eagles. Sportswriter Bonar Ekanem from the West African Pilot attributed this win to Jerry: "Beit haLevi has done his job. For the first time since his arrival in this country as a coach, I hand him a bouquet of roses" (27 November 1961). He went even further in this praise a few days later: "Hail, Beit Halevi!...where we hitherto had wild and ‘bushman’ soccer, we have now thoroughbred and civilized exchanges with economic of energy and goal certainty" (29 November 1961). The second game was held in Tunisia on 10 December. Beit Halevi was not permitted by the Tunisians to come to the game due to the hostile relations between Israel and Tunisia.

All in all, Jerry led Nigeria to four wins, five draws, and three losses.

During this time he was also heavily involved in trying to exhume the body of his brother for burial in Israel, but was unsuccessful.
