= 1934–35 Palestine League =

Palestine League
- Season: 1934–35
- Matches played: 22
- Goals scored: 75 (3.41 per match)

The 1934–35 Palestine League was the third season of league football in the British Mandate for Palestine. The season started on 22 December 1934 and was abandoned in March 1935, first due to preparations to the 1935 Maccabiah Games and then due to disagreements between Maccabi and Hapoel

Initially the EIFA set the number of teams in the league to eight, seven from the previous season (without Maccabi Rehovot that failed to register for the season) and an eighth spot to be decided after two test matches between Hakoah Tel Aviv and Hapoel Petah Tikva. After two test matches, each won 2–1 by each team, the EIFA expanded the league to ten teams, including both teams and Maccabi Rehovot.

== League table ==
Pos	Team	Pld	W	D	L	GF	GA	GR	Pts	HTA	HPT	HKT	MJR	HHA	MPT	MTA	MNZ	MRV	HJR
1	Hapoel Tel Aviv	8	7	0	1	22	3	7.333	14	—		5–0		2–1	2–0				
2	Hapoel Petah Tikva	5	3	1	1	12	5	2.400	7	2–0	—	1–1			3–0			5–0	
3	Hakoah Tel Aviv	5	3	1	1	8	7	1.143	7			—	3–1						
4	Maccabi Hasmonean Jerusalem	3	2	0	1	8	4	2.000	4		4–1		—						3–0
5	Hapoel Haifa	4	2	0	2	8	6	1.333	4	0–3				—					5–0
6	Maccabi Avshalom Petah Tikva	7	2	0	5	10	14	0.714	4			0–3		1–2	—		3–0 (Note: The match was abandoned with the score 2–2 as a Nes Ziona player was ordered to leave the pitch and refused to do so.)		3–0
7	Maccabi Tel Aviv	3	1	1	1	6	8	0.750	3						4–3	—			
8	Maccabi Nes Tziona	4	1	1	2	4	6	0.667	3	0–1						2–2	—		2–0
9	Maccabi Rehovot	3	1	0	2	3	9	0.333	2	0–4						1–1		—	
10	Hapoel Jerusalem	6	0	0	6	0	19	0.000	0	0–5		0–1							—

Updated to match(es) played on 9 March 1935. Source: EIFA League Tables 1930-1948, p. 32
