= 1937 Palestine Cup =

Tournament details
- Country: Mandatory Palestine
- Teams: 13

Final positions
- Champions: Hapoel Tel Aviv (3rd title)
- Runners-up: Hapoel HaDarom Tel Aviv

Tournament statistics
- Matches played: 13
- Goals scored: 59 (4.54 per match)

The 1937 Palestine Cup (Hebrew: הגביע הארץ-ישראלי, HaGavia HaEretz-Israeli) was the eighth season of Israeli Football Association's nationwide football cup competition. The defending holders were Maccabi Avshalom Petah Tikva.

Reinstated after a year's hiatus, due to the outbreak of the 1936-1939 Arab revolt, the competition saw Hapoel HaDarom Tel Aviv upsetting Maccabi Tel Aviv and reaching the final, aided by suspensions that were handed to Maccabi players, forcing the club to field a youth team for the Semi-final match against Hapoel HaDarom

In the final, Hapoel Tel Aviv defeated Hapoel HaDarom 3–0 to win its third cup.

== Results ==
=== First round ===
Home team	Score	Away team
Hapoel Haifa	2–0	Hapoel HaKochav Tel Aviv
Maccabi Bar Kokhva Jerusalem	0–10	Maccabi Tel Aviv
Hapoel Tel Aviv	12–1	Maccabi Haifa
Hakoah Tel Aviv	4–1	Hapoel Jerusalem
Maccabi Nes Tziona	1–2	Maccabi Avshalom Petah Tikva
Maccabi Hadera	1–0 (a.e.t.)	Hapoel Herzliya

Byes: Hapoel HaDarom Tel Aviv, Hapoel Rishon LeZion

=== Quarter-finals ===
Home team	Score	Away team
Hapoel Haifa	2–3	Hapoel Tel Aviv
Hapoel HaDarom Tel Aviv	5–2	Maccabi Avshalom Petah Tikva
Hakoah Tel Aviv	0–0	Maccabi Tel Aviv
Maccabi Hadera	w/o	Hapoel Rishon LeZion

==== Replay ====
Home team	Score	Away team
Maccabi Tel Aviv	1–0	Hakoah Tel Aviv

=== Semi-finals ===
Home team	Score	Away team
Hapoel Tel Aviv	5–0 (Note: The match was abandoned after a Maccabi Hadera player attacked the referee. The result at the time of the abandonment was confirmed by the EIFA.)	Maccabi Hadera
Hapoel HaDarom Tel Aviv	2–1	Maccabi Tel Aviv

=== Final ===
9 May 1937

Hapoel Tel Aviv	3–0	Hapoel HaDarom Tel Aviv
? 55'; Bakshi 57' (o.g.); Poliakov 86'	Palestine Post

Maccabiah Stadium, Tel Aviv
