= Peri Neufeld =

Israeli footballer (1913–1982)

Peri Neufeld פרי נויפלד
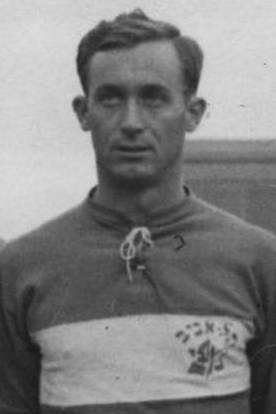
- Neufeld with Maccabi Tel Aviv in 1939

Personal information
- Full name: Franz Neufeld
- Date of birth: 1 July 1913
- Place of birth: Hungary
- Date of death: 17 January 1982 (aged 68)
- Position: Forward

Senior career*
Years	Team	Apps	(Gls)
1933	Tersana	5	(1)
1934–1945	Maccabi Tel Aviv	45	(53)
1945–1948	Hakoah Tel Aviv		

International career
1938	Mandatory Palestine	2	(1)
- * Club domestic league appearances and goals

Franz "Peri" Neufeld (Hebrew: פרי נויפלד; 1 July 1913 – 17 January 1982), also known as Kfir Neufeld (Hebrew: כפורי נויפלד), was an Israeli footballer who played as a forward.

At club level, he played for Tersana in Egypt, and Maccabi Tel Aviv and Hakoah Tel Aviv in Israel. He also represented the Mandatory Palestine national team in 1938.

== International career ==
Neufeld played for Mandatory Palestine at the 1938 FIFA World Cup qualification games against Greece. He featured in both matches, scoring a goal in the home game on 22 January 1938. The two games were his only international caps.
