= Shimon Ratner =

Polish footballer (1898–1964)

Personal information
- Full name: Shimon Ratner Leumi
- Date of birth: 26 July 1898
- Place of birth: Kraków, Grand Duchy of Kraków, Austro-Hungarian Empire
- Date of death: 21 January 1964 (aged 65)
- Place of death: Petah Tikva, Israel

Senior career*
Years	Team	Apps	(Gls)
- Hakoah Vienna
- Maccabi Tel Aviv
- Maccabi Petah Tikva

Managerial career
- Maccabi Tel Aviv
- Maccabi Petah Tikva
- 1934: British Mandate for Palestine
- Hapoel Petah Tikva
- * Club domestic league appearances and goals

Shimon Ratner (Hebrew: שמעון רוטנר; 26 July 1898 – 21 January 1964), also known as Shimon Leumi (Hebrew: שמעון לאומי) and by the nickname "Lumek" (Hebrew: לומק), was a Polish-born football player and coach, who coached the Mandatory Palestine national team in 1934, taking control of them for their first ever match during the 1934 FIFA World Cup qualification campaign.

== Biography ==
Ratner was born in Kraków, Grand Duchy of Kraków, Austro-Hungarian Empire (in modern-day Poland), to a Jewish family. He emigrated to Vienna in 1914, where he joined Hakoah Vienna. In 1920 Ratner emigrated to Mandatory Palestine, where he joined Maccabi Tel Aviv, later also acting as the club's manager. In 1928 Ratner moved to Maccabi Avshalom Petah Tikva, and later to Hapoel Petah Tikva, where he stayed, in several functions, including as club manager, until 1954. In 1934, Ratner was appointed as manager of the Mandatory Palestine national team for its campaign in the 1934 FIFA World Cup qualification. After the campaign, which lasted two matches, Ratner stepped down. Ratner, who hebraized his last name to Leumi, died on 21 January 1964.
