= 1938–39 Palestine League =

Palestine League
- Season: 1938–39
- Champions: Hapoel Tel Aviv; 3rd title
- Matches played: 39
- Goals scored: 163 (4.18 per match)

The 1938–39 Palestine League was the sixth season of league football in the British Mandate for Palestine. The defending champions were Maccabi Tel Aviv.

According to the Israel Football Association, Hapoel Tel Aviv won the title. League matches were played from 5 February 1938 to 4 June 1938, completing the first half of the season before the summer break. However, as the Arab revolt intensified in fall 1938 and with the High commissioner issuing restrictive orders on travel throughout Palestine, the EIFA created a two-tiered league for the Tel Aviv region, with matches played in the league counting towards the national league. The Tel Aviv League was completed on 14 January 1939 and in February 1939 a new league season began, with teams playing in regionalized divisions instead a national league.

== League table ==
Pos	Team	Pld	W	D	L	GF	GA	GR	Pts	HTA	MTA	POL	HHF	HKT	HHZ	MPT	MNZ	RAF
1	Hapoel Tel Aviv	11	9	2	0	27	9	3.000	20	—	0–0			4–1		4–0		3–1
2	Maccabi Tel Aviv	11	7	3	1	44	13	3.385	17	2–2	—	6–0	7–3	3–2		2–0		10–1
3	Palestine Police Force	8	5	0	3	21	17	1.235	10	1–2		—		4–3				4–3
4	Hapoel Haifa	8	4	1	3	15	17	0.882	9	0–1		2–1	—	1–1			4–3	2–1
5	Hakoah Tel Aviv	11	3	2	6	19	28	0.679	8	1–3	0–6			—	2–0	2–1	1–1	3–0
6	Hapoel Herzliya	8	3	0	5	11	20	0.550	6	2–4	3–1	0–6	0–3		—	1–0		3–0
7	Maccabi Petah Tikva	11	2	2	7	13	20	0.650	6	0–1	1–1	1–2	3–0	5–3		—	2–2	
8	Maccabi Nes Tziona	8	1	2	5	12	23	0.522	4	1–3	1–6	0–3			4–2		—	
9	Royal Air Force	8	2	0	6	10	25	0.400	4							2–0	2–0	—

Updated to match(es) played on 17 January 1939. Source: IFA

== Tel Aviv League ==
Pos	Team	Pld	W	D	L	GF	GA	GR	Pts		HTA	MTA	MPT	HKT
1	Hapoel Tel Aviv	6	5	1	0	17	6	2.833	11	Champions	—	3–1	4–0	4–2
2	Maccabi Tel Aviv	6	4	1	1	18	8	2.250	9		2–2	—	3–1	4–2
3	Maccabi Petah Tikva	6	1	1	4	7	14	0.500	3		0–1	0–2	—	5–3
4	Hakoah Tel Aviv	6	0	1	5	9	23	0.391	1		1–3	0–6	1–1	—

Updated to match(es) played on 17 January 1939. Source: 100 Years of Football 1906-2006, Elisha Shohat (2006), p. 80
