= 1933–34 Palestine League =

Palestine League
- Season: 1933–34
- Champions: Hapoel Tel Aviv
- Matches played: 53
- Goals scored: 179 (3.38 per match)

The 1933–34 Palestine League was the second season of league football in the British Mandate for Palestine. The defending champions, British Police didn't take part in this season following an order by the High Commissioner forbidding British teams to play Jewish teams.

The season was played between November 1933 and April 1934. Five matches remained to be played, but were never completed. The championship was won by Hapoel Tel Aviv, who finished the season unbeaten.

== League table ==
Pos	Team	Pld	W	D	L	GF	GA	GR	Pts	HTA	MHJ	HHA	MPT	MTA	MNZ	MRV	HJE	MHA
1	Hapoel Tel Aviv (C)	14	14	0	0	45	7	6.429	28	—	5–1 (Note: The match was played on 25 November 1933 and ended in a 2–0 to Hapoel Tel Aviv. Following appeal by Hashmonai the match was replayed on 14 July 1934.)	5–0	1–0	4–0	2–1	3–0	4–2	
2	Maccabi Hashmonai	13	7	2	4	27	17	1.588	16	1–2	—	1–1	2–0	1–0	3–1	6–1	3–0	
3	Hapoel Haifa	11	5	4	2	25	18	1.389	14	0–2	2–2	—	4–1	2–2	7–1	2–1	3–1	
4	Maccabi Petah Tikva	11	5	2	4	13	15	0.867	12	0–5	–	–	—	2–1	3–0	2–0	0–0	6–0 (Note: Maccabi Haifa withdrew from the league after playing two matches due to travel costs.)
5	Maccabi Tel Aviv	12	4	3	5	25	20	1.250	11	2–3	3–1	1–1	– (Note: The match was abandoned with the score of 1–1 and no official decision regarding the match was made by the EIFA.)	—	1–2	5–0	7–2	
6	Maccabi Nes Tziona	13	4	2	7	10	24	0.417	10	0–3	1–0	1–3	0–0	–	—	1–0	0–0	
7	Maccabi Rehovot	13	2	2	9	11	30	0.367	6	0–3	0–3	–	1–2	1–1	2–0	—	3–0	
8	Hapoel Jerusalem	13	0	3	10	10	35	0.286	3	0–3	1–3	–	1–3	1–2	0–2	2–2	—	
9	Maccabi Haifa (F)	0	0	0	0	0	0	—	0							2–7		—

Updated to match(es) played on 14 July 1934. Source: IFA, Do'ar HaYom
(C) Champions; (F) Folded
