= Lebanon national football team results (unofficial matches) =

This is a list of the Lebanon national football team results from 1934 to the present day that, for various reasons, are not considered official matches by the Lebanese Football Association.

== Results ==
=== 1950s ===
5 July 1955 Friendly	Neftyanik Baku (Soviet Union)	2–4	Lebanon
--:--

5 February 1956 Friendly	Lebanon	2–1	Austria Vienna	Beirut, Lebanon
--:--

1957 Friendly	Dynamo Moscow (Soviet Union)	7–1	Lebanon	Moscow, Soviet Union
--:--			Tchaparian

1957 Friendly	Lebanon	1–0	(Romania) Energia Flacara Ploiesti	Beirut, Lebanon
--:--	Abou Mrad

1957 Friendly	Greece Military	1–3	Lebanon	Greece
--:--			Altounian; Tchaparian; Chehade

1957 Friendly	Leipzig (East Germany)	4–3	Lebanon	Leipzig, East Germany
--:--			Altounian; Abou Mrad

1957 Friendly	Bulgaria B	1–0	Lebanon	Bulgaria
--:--			Abou Mrad

1957 Friendly	Spartak Trnava (Czechoslovakia)	2–2	Lebanon	Trnava, Czechoslovakia
--:--			Tchaparian; Buchakjian

12 October 1959 1959 Mediterranean Games	Lebanon	0–2	Italy Amateurs	Beirut, Lebanon
--:--		Report	Benaglia 14'; Cella 65'	Stadium: Beirut Municipal Stadium; Attendance: 15,000; Referee: Raymond Lespineux (Belgium)

14 October 1959 1959 Mediterranean Games	Lebanon	0–3	Turkey Amateurs	Beirut, Lebanon
--:--		Report	Soydan 23', 57', 81'	Stadium: Beirut Municipal Stadium; Attendance: 7,000; Referee: Helge Andersen (Denmark)

18 October 1959 1959 Mediterranean Games	Italy Amateurs	5–0	Lebanon	Beirut, Lebanon
--:--	Sanzani 15', 50', 58'; Benetti 44'; Del Negro 52'	Report		Stadium: Beirut Municipal Stadium; Referee: Sulhi Garan (Turkey)

21 October 1959 1959 Mediterranean Games	Turkey Amateurs	2–1	Lebanon	Beirut, Lebanon
--:--	Elmastaşoğlu 45'; Büyükvardar 72'	Report	Kassabian 78'	Stadium: Beirut Municipal Stadium; Attendance: 7,000; Referee: Francesco Liverani (Italy)

=== 1960s ===
20 September 1963 1963 Mediterranean Games	Spain Amateurs	1–0	Lebanon	Benevento, Italy
--:--	Grosso 81'			Stadium: Stadio Gennaro Meomartini; Referee: Giuseppe Adami (Italy)

21 September 1963 1963 Mediterranean Games	Turkey Amateurs	4–0	Lebanon	Caserta, Italy
--:--	Doğan 9', 52'; Boralı 19' (pen.); Büyükbuğdaypınar 58'	Report		Stadium: Stadio Alberto Pinto; Attendance: 5,000; Referee: Abdelkarim Ziani (Morocco)

23 September 1963 1963 Mediterranean Games	Lebanon	2–0	Malta Amateurs	Salerno, Italy
--:--	Al Sharqi 32'; Tchaparian 39'			Stadium: Stadio Donato Vestuti

10 March 1964 1964 Tripoli Fair Tournament	Malta Amateur FA	0–2	Lebanon	Libya
--:--

13 March 1964 1964 Tripoli Fair Tournament	Lebanon	3–1	Morocco B	Libya
--:--

15 March 1964 1964 Tripoli Fair Tournament	Sudan B	1–1	Lebanon	Libya
--:--

7 September 1965 1965 Arab Games	Lebanon	4–3	Aden	Cairo, Egypt
--:--

9 June 1966 Friendly	Cap-Vert Corporate XI (Senegal)	3–2	Lebanon	Dakar, Senegal
--:--				Stadium: Stade de l'Amitie

22 January 1967 Friendly	Lebanon	0–1	(Germany) Lower Rhine XI	Beirut, Lebanon
--:--

15 September 1967 Friendly	Lebanon	2–0	Kuwait SC	Beirut, Lebanon
--:--

17 September 1967 Friendly	Lebanon	4–0	Kuwait SC	Beirut, Lebanon
--:--

7 December 1969 Friendly	Lebanon	0–5	Soviet Union Olympic	Beirut, Lebanon
--:--				Stadium: Camille Chamoun Sports City Stadium; Referee: Sarkis Demirdjian (Lebanon)

=== 1970s ===
4 July 1970 1970 Al-Jalaa Tournament	Libya B	2–0	Lebanon	Tripoli, Libya
--:--				Referee: El Diba (Egypt)

6 July 1970 1970 Al-Jalaa Tournament	Lebanon	3–2	Team Palestine	Tripoli, Libya
--:--

1974 Friendly	Lebanon	2–1	Brazil U21	Beirut, Lebanon
--:--

24 September 1974 Friendly	Lebanon	4–0	(Lebanon) Cedarjet
--:--

27 September 1974 1974 Kuneitra Cup	Algeria B	4–1	Lebanon	Damascus, Syria
--:--	Lalmas; Khalem		El Sahili	Stadium: Abbasiyyin Stadium

4 May 1975 Friendly	Lebanon	1–0	Cuba U20	Beirut, Lebanon
--:--				Stadium: Bourj Hammoud Stadium; Referee: Avedis Torossian (Lebanon)

11 May 1975 1975 President's Cup	Perak (Malaysia)	1–3	Lebanon	Seoul, South Korea
--:--	P. Umaparam 62'	Report	Shatila 40'; Hatoum 49' (pen.); Al Ghoul 70'	Stadium: Dongdaemun Stadium

14 May 1975 1975 President's Cup	Indonesia B	0–4	Lebanon	Seoul, South Korea
18:00 UTC+9		Report	Hatoum 17'; Kalfayan 33'; Sahili 59'; Al Ghoul 63'	Stadium: Dongdaemun Stadium

18 May 1975 1975 President's Cup	Japan B	1–0	Lebanon	Seoul, South Korea
15:00 UTC+9	Nakayama 39'	Report		Stadium: Dongdaemun Stadium

10 September 1978 1978 President's Cup	Lebanon	1–7	Mexico XI	Jeonju, South Korea
15:45 UTC+9	Kapila 15'	Report	Morales 20'; Sánchez 32'; Montes	Stadium: Jeonju Sports Complex Stadium

14 September 1978 1978 President's Cup	Lebanon	1–6	United States Olympic	Seoul, South Korea
19:00 UTC+9				Stadium: Dongdaemun Stadium

=== 1980s ===
30 August 1987 Friendly	Lebanon	2–1	(Syria) Al-Shorta	Beirut, Lebanon
--:--				Stadium: Nejmeh Stadium; Referee: Talal Saleh (Lebanon)

18 September 1987 1987 Mediterranean Games	Turkey Olympic	1–0	Lebanon	Aleppo, Syria
--:--	Özdilek 42'	Report		Stadium: Al-Hamadaniah Stadium; Referee: Jean-Marie Lartigot (France)

21 March 1988 Friendly	Lebanon	2–0	(Syria) Jableh	Beirut, Lebanon
--:--	Abboud (pen.); Hammoud			Stadium: Safa Stadium; Referee: Ammar Ammar (Lebanon)

29 March 1988 Friendly	Lebanon	0–1	(Syria) Al-Wathba	Beirut, Lebanon
--:--				Stadium: Safa Stadium; Referee: Taleb Ramadan (Lebanon)

26 June 1988 Friendly	Safa (Lebanon)	0–1	Lebanon	Beirut, Lebanon
--:--				Stadium: Safa Stadium; Referee: Youssef Hamdar (Lebanon)

=== 1990s ===
28 June 1992 Friendly	Lebanon	2–1	(Syria) Aleppo XI	Tripoli, Lebanon
--:--				Stadium: Tripoli Municipal Stadium; Referee: Omar Mostafa (Lebanon)

25 August 1995 Friendly	Lebanon	3–1	Jordan U23	Khiara, Lebanon
--:--				Stadium: Gamal Abdel Nasser Stadium; Referee: Talal Saleh (Lebanon)

27 August 1995 Friendly	Lebanon	4–2	Jordan U23	Khiara, Lebanon
--:--				Stadium: Gamal Abdel Nasser Stadium

10 September 1995 Friendly	Lebanon	2–1	Qatar U23	Beirut, Lebanon
--:--				Stadium: Beirut Municipal Stadium; Referee: Ammar Ammar (Lebanon)

18 February 1996 Friendly	Lebanon	3–1	(Slovakia) Lokomotíva Košice	Beirut, Lebanon
--:--				Stadium: Beirut Municipal Stadium

17 March 1996 Friendly	Lebanon	1–1	(Sweden) Helsingborgs IF	Beirut, Lebanon
--:--				Stadium: Beirut Municipal Stadium; Referee: Ammar Ammar (Lebanon)

26 July 1996 Friendly	Lebanon	4–0	(Lebanon) Riyada Wal Adab	Sidon, Lebanon
--:--				Stadium: Saida Municipal Stadium; Referee: Afif Hassan (Lebanon)

26 February 1997 Friendly	Lebanon	3–3	Czech Republic U21	Beirut, Lebanon
--:--				Stadium: Bourj Hammoud Stadium; Referee: Ammar Ammar (Lebanon)

3 April 1997 Friendly	Lebanon	0–0	Norway U21	Beirut, Lebanon
--:--				Stadium: Bourj Hammoud Stadium; Referee: Taleb Ramadan (Lebanon)

20 April 1997 Friendly	Lebanon	2–1	South Korea U20	Beirut, Lebanon
--:--				Stadium: Bourj Hammoud Stadium; Referee: Nabil Ayyad (Lebanon)

24 May 1998 Friendly	Lebanon	0–7	Germany U21	Beirut, Lebanon
--:--				Stadium: Beirut Municipal Stadium; Referee: Drar Al Tamimi (Jordan)

21 April 1998 Friendly	Lebanon	0–1	(Socialist Federal Republic of Yugoslavia) Yugoslavia XI	Jounieh, Lebanon
--:--				Stadium: Fouad Chehab Stadium; Referee: Ammar Ammar (Lebanon)

July 1998 Friendly	Ismaily (Egypt)	2–1	Lebanon	Egypt
--:--				Stadium: Al Mokawloon Al Arab Stadium

July 1998 Friendly	Nassig Helwan (Egypt)	0–5	Lebanon	Egypt
--:--

July 1998 Friendly	Almaza (Egypt)	1–4	Lebanon	Egypt
--:--

21 August 1998 Friendly	Armenia Olympic	1–0	Lebanon	Yerevan, Armenia
--:--

13 September 1998 Friendly	Lebanon	2–0	Egypt U23	Beirut, Lebanon
--:--				Stadium: Beirut Municipal Stadium; Referee: Taleb Ramadan (Lebanon)

21 January 1999 Friendly	Lebanon	1–1	(Sweden) Helsingborgs IF	Beirut, Lebanon
--:--				Stadium: Beirut Municipal Stadium; Referee: Ammar Ammar (Lebanon)

24 January 1999 Friendly	Lebanon	2–3	(Sweden) Helsingborgs IF	Beirut, Lebanon
--:--				Stadium: Beirut Municipal Stadium; Referee: Nabil Ayyad (Lebanon)

10 February 1999 Friendly	Lebanon	0–3	Czech Republic U21	Beirut, Lebanon
--:--				Stadium: Beirut Municipal Stadium; Referee: Taleb Ramadan (Lebanon)

=== 2000s ===
12 January 2000 Friendly	Lebanon	1–0	(Socialist Federal Republic of Yugoslavia) Red Star Belgrade	Beirut, Lebanon
--:--				Stadium: Beirut Municipal Stadium; Referee: Nabil Ayyad (Lebanon)

26 January 2000 Friendly	Lebanon	0–2	(Socialist Federal Republic of Yugoslavia) Red Star Belgrade	Beirut, Lebanon
--:--				Stadium: Beirut Municipal Stadium; Referee: Mohammad Mansour (Lebanon)

10 May 2000 Friendly	Apollon Limassol (Cyprus)	5–4	Lebanon	Larnaca, Cyprus
--:--				Referee: (Cyprus)

16 May 2000 Friendly	AEL Limassol (Cyprus)	0–2	Lebanon	Larnaca, Cyprus
--:--

20 July 2000 Friendly	Žiar nad Hronom (Slovakia)	0–0	Lebanon	Slovakia
--:--

22 July 2000 Friendly	ZŤS VTJ Martin (Slovakia)	0–2	Lebanon	Slovakia
--:--

25 July 2000 Friendly	Spartak Trnava (Slovakia)	3–3	Lebanon	Slovakia
--:--

16 August 2000 Friendly	Trier XI (Germany)	v	Lebanon	Trier, Germany
--:--

22 August 2000 Friendly	Eschen (Liechtenstein)	0–3	Lebanon
--:--

26 August 2000 Friendly	Aris Bonnevoie (Luxembourg)	1–4	Lebanon
--:--

29 August 2000 Friendly	Etzella Ettelbruck (Luxembourg)	1–3	Lebanon
--:--

25 September 2000 Friendly	APOP Paphos (Cyprus)	0–6	Lebanon	Larnaca, Cyprus
--:--

27 September 2000 Friendly	Cyprus Olympic	2–5	Lebanon	Larnaca, Cyprus
--:--

11 April 2001 Friendly	Lebanon	1–1	(Greece) Aris Thessaloniki	Tripoli, Lebanon
--:--				Stadium: Tripoli Municipal Stadium; Referee: Ammar Ammar (Lebanon)

May 2001 Friendly	v	Lebanon	Slovakia
--:--

May 2001 Friendly	v	Lebanon	Slovakia
--:--

May 2001 Friendly	v	Lebanon	Slovakia
--:--

11 August 2002 Friendly	Lebanon	1–1	(Lebanon) Nejmeh	Beirut, Lebanon
--:--				Stadium: Beirut Municipal Stadium; Referee: Talaat Najm (Lebanon)
Note: The date could be incorrect.

August 2002 Friendly	Ittihad Aleppo (Syria)	0–0	Lebanon	Aleppo, Syria
--:--

23 August 2002 Friendly	Al-Hurriya (Syria)	0–2	Lebanon	Aleppo, Syria
--:--

26 August 2002 Friendly	Ittihad Aleppo (Syria)	v	Lebanon	Aleppo, Syria
--:--

3 March 2003 Friendly	Lebanon	0–2	(Armenia) Mika	Tripoli, Lebanon
--:--				Stadium: Tripoli Municipal Stadium

14 August 2003 Friendly	Syria	0–0	Lebanon	Damascus, Syria
--:--				Stadium: Tishreen Stadium; Referee: Mahmoud Abbas (Syria)
Note: The match ended at half-time.

3 July 2006 Friendly	Lebanon	2–0	(Iraq) Kirkuk
--:--

17 January 2008 Friendly	Thailand B	1–0	Lebanon	Bangkok, Thailand
--:--

=== 2010s ===
8 November 2011 Friendly	Lebanon	3–1	Thailand	Doha, Qatar
--:--	Maatouk; Ismail
Note: The match was played in three halves.

8 September 2014 Friendly	Brazil Olympic	2–2	Lebanon	Doha, Qatar
21:00 UTC+3	Ademilson 3'; Araújo 88'		Ghaddar 45+3'; Maatouk 53'	Stadium: Al Gharafa Stadium

=== 2020s ===
18 August 2021 Friendly	Lebanon	0–1	(Qatar) Al-Shamal	Isparta, Turkey
--:--				Stadium: Eğirdir Stadium

27 August 2021 Friendly	Fujairah (United Arab Emirates)	0–2	Lebanon	Dubai, United Arab Emirates
--:--				Stadium: Shabab Al Ahli Stadium

24 August 2025 Friendly	Qatar	0–1	Lebanon	Al Rayyan, Qatar
18:30 UTC+3		Report; LFA report	Kaddour 6'	Stadium: Khalifa International Stadium; Attendance: 0
Note: The match was not considered an official international fixture, as it was played in two 35-minute halves (70 minutes in total).

27 September 2026 Friendly	Al Sadd (Qatar)	1–2	Lebanon	Al Rayyan, Qatar
18:30 UTC+3	Firmino 15'	Report	Shahin 3'; Chakroun 26'	Stadium: Jassim bin Hamad Stadium; Attendance: 0
Note: The match was played in two 30-minute halves.

== Beirut XI ==
Beirut XI (Arabic: منتخب بيروت) was a representative football team composed of selected players from clubs based in Beirut, Lebanon, formed to play friendly matches or tournaments. Beirut XI's main rivals were Damascus XI of Syria, against whom they played 19 times between 1939 and 1987.

The following is a list of matches Beirut XI played throughout its history.

21 November 1935 Friendly	Beirut XI (Lebanon)	0–3	(Romania) CA Timișoara (TAC)	Beirut, Lebanon
--:--

18 December 1935 Friendly	Beirut XI (Lebanon)	2–6	(Romania) Unirea Tricolor București	Beirut, Lebanon
--:--

10 January 1937 Friendly	Beirut XI (Lebanon)	2–8	(Austria) Admira Vienna	Beirut, Lebanon
--:--				Referee: Pierre Gemayel (Lebanon)

17 January 1937 Friendly	Beirut XI (Lebanon)	2–2	(Austria) Admira Vienna	Beirut, Lebanon
--:--				Referee: Gabriel Gemayel (Lebanon)

29 October 1939 Friendly	Beirut XI (Lebanon)	4–5	(Syria) Damascus XI	Beirut, Lebanon
--:--				Stadium: Furn El Chebbak Stadium

14 November 1939 Friendly	Damascus XI (Syria)	1–6	(Lebanon) Beirut XI	Damascus, Syria
--:--

19 April 1942 Friendly	Beirut XI (Lebanon)	2–4	(Lebanon) AUB	Beirut, Lebanon
--:--

27 May 1945 Friendly	Beirut XI (Lebanon)	1–6	(Socialist Federal Republic of Yugoslavia) Hajduk Split	Beirut, Lebanon
--:--

26 May 1946 Friendly	Beirut XI (Lebanon)	0–2	(Egypt) Alexandria XI	Beirut, Lebanon
--:--				Referee: Izzat Turk (Lebanon)

2 February 1947 Friendly	Beirut XI (Lebanon)	5–1	(Syria) Damascus XI	Beirut, Lebanon
--:--				Stadium: Furn El Chebbak Stadium

28 March 1947 Friendly	Damascus XI (Syria)	1–3	(Lebanon) Beirut XI	Damascus, Syria
--:--

25 April 1948 Friendly	Beirut XI (Lebanon)	4–1	(Turkey) Ankara XI	Beirut, Lebanon
--:--

2 May 1948 Friendly	Beirut XI (Lebanon)	3–0	(Turkey) Ankara XI	Beirut, Lebanon
--:--

13 October 1948 Friendly	Ankara XI (Turkey)	6–1	(Lebanon) Beirut XI	Ankara, Turkey
--:--				Stadium: Ankara 19 Mayıs Stadium

15 October 1948 Friendly	Ankara XI (Turkey)	3–0	(Lebanon) Beirut XI	Ankara, Turkey
--:--				Stadium: Ankara 19 Mayıs Stadium

17 October 1948 Friendly	Ankara XI (Turkey)	8–0	(Lebanon) Beirut XI	Ankara, Turkey
--:--				Stadium: Ankara 19 Mayıs Stadium

1952 Friendly	Beirut XI (Lebanon)	0–1	(Syria) Damascus XI	Beirut, Lebanon
--:--

1952 Friendly	Damascus XI (Syria)	8–2	(Lebanon) Beirut XI	Damascus, Syria
--:--

1953 Friendly	Damascus XI (Syria)	1–0	(Lebanon) Beirut XI	Damascus, Syria
--:--

1953 Friendly	Beirut XI (Lebanon)	2–2	(Syria) Damascus XI	Beirut, Lebanon
--:--

1954 Friendly	Beirut XI (Lebanon)	3–1	(Syria) Damascus XI	Beirut, Lebanon
--:--

1954 Friendly	Damascus XI (Syria)	5–1	(Lebanon) Beirut XI	Damascus, Syria
--:--

20 January 1955 Friendly	Beirut XI (Lebanon)	0–6	Bulgaria	Beirut, Lebanon
--:--				Stadium: Beirut Municipal Stadium

1956 Friendly	Beirut XI (Lebanon)	2–0	(Syria) Damascus XI	Beirut, Lebanon
--:--

1956 Friendly	Damascus XI (Syria)	2–1	(Lebanon) Beirut XI	Damascus, Syria
--:--

24 February 1957 Friendly	Beirut XI (Lebanon)	1–3	East Germany XI	Beirut, Lebanon
--:--

26 February 1957 Friendly	Beirut XI (Lebanon)	2–2	East Germany XI	Beirut, Lebanon
--:--

28 August 1959 Friendly	Damascus XI (United Arab Republic)	4–1	(Lebanon) Beirut XI	Damascus, Syria
--:--

5 September 1959 Friendly	Beirut XI (Lebanon)	v	(United Arab Republic) Aleppo XI	Beirut, Lebanon
--:--

13 September 1959 Friendly	Beirut XI (Lebanon)	2–1	(United Arab Republic) Damascus XI	Beirut, Lebanon
--:--

27 September 1959 Friendly	Beirut XI (Lebanon)	1–3	(United Arab Republic) Damascus XI B	Beirut, Lebanon
--:--

30 October 1959 Friendly	Damascus XI B (United Arab Republic)	v	(Lebanon) Beirut XI	Damascus, Syria
--:--

8 November 1959 Friendly	Beirut XI (Lebanon)	0–8	(Soviet Union) Spartak Yerevan	Beirut, Lebanon
--:--

30 April 1961 Friendly	Beirut XI (Lebanon)	2–1	(Lebanon) Beirut XI B	Beirut, Lebanon
--:--

21 May 1961 Friendly	Beirut XI (Lebanon)	0–1	(Brazil) Madureira	Beirut, Lebanon
--:--

6 May 1962 Friendly	Beirut XI (Lebanon)	2–2	(West Germany) VfB Stuttgart	Beirut, Lebanon
--:--

28 October 1962 Friendly	Beirut XI (Lebanon)	2–2	(United States) New York All-Stars	Beirut, Lebanon
--:--

27 January 1963 Friendly	Beirut XI (Lebanon)	3–1	(Romania) Petrolul Ploiești	Beirut, Lebanon
--:--

16 June 1963 Friendly	Beirut XI (Lebanon)	2–1	(Syria) Damascus XI	Beirut, Lebanon
--:--				Stadium: Camille Chamoun Sports City Stadium

21 June 1963 Friendly	Damascus XI (Syria)	0–0	(Lebanon) Beirut XI	Damascus, Syria
--:--				Stadium: Damascus Municipal Stadium

7 July 1963 Friendly	Beirut XI (Lebanon)	6–0	(Brazil) Brazilian Army (UNEF)	Beirut, Lebanon
--:--

6 September 1963 Friendly	North Lebanon XI	0–1	(Lebanon) Beirut XI	Tripoli, Lebanon
--:--

8 September 1963 Friendly	Beirut XI (Lebanon)	2–0	(Lebanon) Mazraa–Sinharib	Bhamdoun, Lebanon
--:--

15 December 1963 Friendly	Beirut XI (Lebanon)	1–3	(Soviet Union) Shakhtar Donetsk	Beirut, Lebanon
--:--

22 December 1963 Friendly	Beirut XI (Lebanon)	2–1	(Soviet Union) Shakhtar Donetsk	Beirut, Lebanon
--:--

3 June 1964 Friendly	Beirut XI (Lebanon)	1–5	(Brazil) Flamengo	Beirut, Lebanon
--:--

6 December 1964 Friendly	Beirut XI (Lebanon)	1–1	(Soviet Union) Ararat Yerevan	Beirut, Lebanon
--:--

28 February 1965 Friendly	Beirut XI (Lebanon)	0–2	(Czech Republic) Sparta Prague	Beirut, Lebanon
--:--

18 April 1965 Friendly	Aleppo XI (Syria)	1–1	(Lebanon) Beirut XI	Aleppo, Syria
--:--

1 August 1965 Friendly	North Lebanon XI	3–0	(Lebanon) Beirut XI	Tripoli, Lebanon
--:--

15 August 1965 Friendly	Tyre XI (Lebanon)	1–3	(Lebanon) Beirut XI	Tyre, Lebanon
--:--

5 December 1965 Friendly	Beirut XI (Lebanon)	1–5	(Czech Republic) Jednota Trenčín	Beirut, Lebanon
--:--

12 December 1965 Friendly	Beirut XI (Lebanon)	2–1	(Syria) Aleppo XI	Beirut, Lebanon
--:--

13 February 1966 Friendly	Beirut XI (Lebanon)	4–1	(Lebanon) Racing–Homenetmen–Nejmeh	Beirut, Lebanon
--:--

13 March 1966 Friendly	Beirut XI (Lebanon)	0–0	(Soviet Union) Torpedo Moscow	Beirut, Lebanon
--:--

27 December 1966 Friendly	Beirut XI (Lebanon)	1–6	Soviet Union Olympic	Beirut, Lebanon
--:--

1 September 1967 Friendly	Beirut XI (Lebanon)	5–0	(Lebanon) Safa	Beirut, Lebanon
--:--

4 February 1968 Friendly	Beirut XI (Lebanon)	1–1	(United Arab Republic) Ismaily	Beirut, Lebanon
--:--

10 December 1969 Friendly	Beirut XI (Lebanon)	2–2	Soviet Union Olympic	Beirut, Lebanon
--:--

1971 Friendly	Beirut XI (Lebanon)	1–1	(Syria) Damascus XI
--:--

9 July 1987 Friendly	Beirut XI (Lebanon)	1–0	(Syria) Damascus XI	Beirut, Lebanon
--:--				Stadium: Nejmeh Stadium; Referee: Ammar Ammar (Lebanon)

7 August 1987 Friendly	Beirut XI (Lebanon)	1–0	(Syria) Damascus XI	Beirut, Lebanon
--:--				Stadium: Nejmeh Stadium; Referee: Talal Saleh (Lebanon)

== Bibliography ==
- Sakr, Ali Hamidi (1992). موسوعة كرة القدم اللبنانية 1991–1992 [1991–1992 Lebanese Football Encyclopedia] (PDF) (in Arabic). مؤسسة نوفل للتوزيع. ISBN 0000281247.
