= Football at the 1963 Mediterranean Games =

1963 Mediterranean Games football tournament
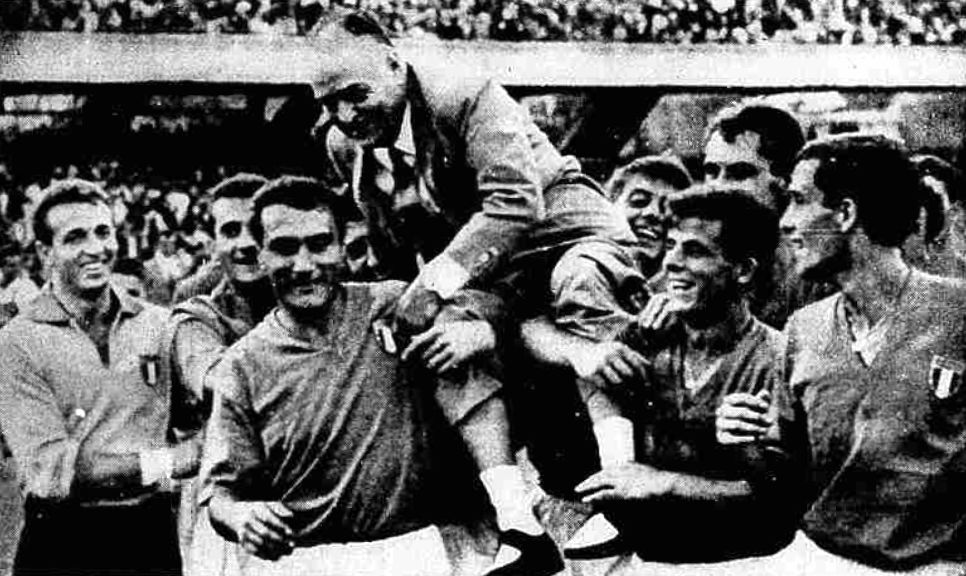
- Italy's celebration for the gold medal

Tournament details
- Host country: Italy
- City: Naples
- Dates: 18–28 September 1963
- Teams: 9 (from 3 confederations)
- Venue: 4 (in 4 host cities)

Final positions
- Champions: Italy Amateurs (2nd title)
- Runners-up: Turkey Amateurs
- Third place: Spain Amateurs
- Fourth place: Morocco

Tournament statistics
- Matches played: 17
- Goals scored: 45 (2.65 per match)
- Top scorer(s): (Spain) Ramón Grosso (8 goals)

The 1963 Mediterranean Games football tournament was the 4th edition of the Mediterranean Games men's football tournament. The football tournament was held in Naples, Italy between the 18–28 September 1963 as part of the 1963 Mediterranean Games.

== Participating teams ==
The following countries have participated for the final tournament:

Federation	Nation
CAF Africa	Morocco; Tunisia; United Arab Republic
AFC Asia	Lebanon
UEFA Europe	Spain Amateurs; Malta Amateurs; Italy Amateurs (hosts) (holders); Turkey Amateurs

== Venues ==
Cities	Venues	Capacity
Naples	Stadio San Paolo	100,000
Caserta	Stadio Alberto Pinto	12,000
Benevento	Stadio Comunale	
Salerno	Stadio Comunale	9,000

== Group stage ==
All times local : CET (UTC+1)

Key to colours in group tables
Group winners advance to the Final
Group runners-up advance to the Third place match

=== Group A ===
Team	Pld	W	D	L	GF	GA	GD	Pts
Italy Amateurs	3	3	0	0	12	1	+11	6
Morocco	3	2	0	1	3	4	−1	4
Tunisia	3	1	0	2	3	4	−1	2
Syria	3	0	0	3	1	10	−9	0

21 September 1963

Morocco	1–0	Syria
Goal

Stadio Comunale, Benevento
21 September 1963

Italy Amateurs	2–0	Tunisia
Ferrario 19', 70'

Stadio San Paolo, Naples
Attendance: 12,000

25 September 1963

Morocco	1–0	Tunisia
Ben Dayan 53'

Stadio Alberto Pinto, Caserta
Attendance: 2,000
25 September 1963

Italy Amateurs	6–0	Syria
Ferrario 10' (pen.); Volpato 13', 51'; Lodetti 47'; Petroni 29', 56'

Stadio Comunale, Benevento
Referee: Daniel Zariquiegui Izco (Spain)

27 September 1963

Italy Amateurs	4–1	Morocco
Bercellino I 18'; Bercellino II 39', 85'; Volpato 32'		Riadh 70'

Stadio Alberto Pinto, Caserta
Referee: Arthur Lentini (Malta)
27 September 1963

Tunisia	3–1	Syria
Henia 12'; Jedidi 50', 80'		Aleyan 35'

Stadio Comunale, Salerno
Attendance: 1,000

=== Group B ===
Team	Pld	W	D	L	GF	GA	GD	Pts
Turkey Amateurs	4	3	1	0	12	4	+8	7
Spain Amateurs	4	2	2	0	13	4	+9	6
United Arab Republic	4	2	1	1	10	8	+2	5
Lebanon	4	1	0	3	2	7	−5	2
Malta Amateurs	4	0	0	4	0	18	−18	0

18 September 1963

Spain Amateurs	1–1	United Arab Republic
Vidal 22'		El-Shazly 49'

Stadio Comunale, Salerno
Referee: Cesare Jonni (Italy)
21 September 1963

Turkey Amateurs	4–0	Lebanon
Doğan 9', 52'; Boralı 19' (pen.); Büyükbuğdaypınar 58'	Report

Stadio Alberto Pinto, Caserta
Attendance: 5,000
Referee: Abdelkarim Ziani (Morocco)

20 September 1963

United Arab Republic	6–0	Malta Amateurs
Reyadh 21'; Badawi 23', 29', 41'; El-Shazly 49', 71'

Stadio Alberto Pinto, Caserta
20 September 1963

Spain Amateurs	1–0	Lebanon
Grosso 81'

Stadio Comunale, Benevento
Referee: Giuseppe Adami (Italy)

23 September 1963

Turkey Amateurs	3–3	Spain Amateurs
Büyükbuğdaypınar 8'; Roberto Rodríguez 17' (o.g.); Doğan 54'	Report	Grosso 12', 50', 82'

Stadio San Paolo, Naples
Attendance: 5,000
Referee: Gennaro Marchese (Italy)
23 September 1963

Lebanon	2–0	Malta Amateurs
Mekdache 32'; Tchaparian 39'

Stadio Comunale, Salerno

25 September 1963

Turkey Amateurs	2–0	Malta Amateurs
Halil Ateş 3'; Boralı 37'	Report

Stadio San Paolo, Naples
Attendance: 600
Referee: Sbardella (Italy)
26 September 1963

United Arab Republic	2–0 (Lebanon withdrew)	Lebanon

Stadio Comunale, Salerno

27 September 1963

Spain Amateurs	8–0	Malta Amateurs
Uriarte 1', 12', 82'; Grosso 23', 64', 68'; Valls 26'; Velázquez 72'

Stadio Comunale, Benevento
27 September 1963

Turkey Amateurs	3–1	United Arab Republic
Meto 18', 44', 88'	Report	Ismail 31'

Stadio San Paolo, Naples
Referee: Giuseppe Adami (Italy)

== Knockout stage ==
Final
29 September – Naples
Turkey Amateurs	0
Italy Amateurs	3
Third place
29 September – Naples
Morocco	1
Spain Amateurs	2

=== Third place match ===
29 September 1963

Morocco	1–2	Spain Amateurs
Ben Dayan 30'		Grosso 9'; Velázquez 84'

Stadio Comunale, Salerno
Referee: Giuseppe Adami (Italy)

=== Final ===
29 September 1963

Turkey Amateurs	0–3	Italy Amateurs
	Report	Giannini 9'; Bercellino II 33', 43'

Stadio San Paolo, Naples
Attendance: 50,000
Referee: Bahri Ben Said (United Arab Republic)

== Tournament classification ==
Rank	Team	Pld	W	D	L	GF	GA	GD	Pts
1	Italy Amateurs	4	4	0	0	15	2	+12	8
2	Turkey Amateurs	5	3	1	1	12	7	+5	7
3	Spain Amateurs	5	3	2	0	15	5	+10	8
4	Morocco	4	2	0	2	4	6	–2	4
Eliminated in the group stage
5	United Arab Republic	4	2	1	1	10	8	+2	5
6	Tunisia	3	1	0	2	3	4	–1	2
7	Lebanon	4	1	0	3	2	7	–5	2
8	Syria	3	0	0	3	1	10	–9	0
9	Malta Amateurs	4	0	0	4	0	18	–18	0

== Goalscorers ==
There were 57 goals scored in 18 matches, for an average of 3.17 goals per match.

8 goals

- (Spain) Ramón Grosso

4 goals

- (Italy) Silvino Bercellino

3 goals

- (Italy) Paolo Ferrario
- (Italy) Angelo Volpato
- (Spain) Fidel Uriarte
- (Turkey) Nedim Doğan
- (Turkey) Turgay Meto
- (United Arab Republic) Hassan El-Shazly
- (United Arab Republic) Badawi Abdel Fattah

2 goals

- (Italy) Bruno Petroni
- (Morocco) Ali Bendayan
- (Spain) Manuel Velázquez
- (Tunisia) Mohamed Salah Jedidi
- (Turkey) Erol Boralı
- (Turkey) İhsan Büyükbuğdaypınar

1 goal

- (Italy) Giancarlo Bercellino
- (Italy) Luigi Giannini
- (Italy) Giovanni Lodetti
- (Morocco) Mohamed Riadh
- (Spain) José Bosch Valls
- (Spain) Luis Vidal
- (Syria) Aleyan
- (Tunisia) Hammadi Henia
- (Turkey) Halil Ates
- (United Arab Republic) Taha Ismail
- (United Arab Republic) Moustafa Reyadh

1 own goal

- (Spain) Roberto Rodríguez (against Turkey)
