= Bercellino =

Bercellino is an Italian surname. Notable people with the surname include:

- Giancarlo Bercellino (born 1941), Italian footballer
- Silvino Bercellino (born 1946), Italian footballer, brother of Giancarlo
