= Football at the 1959 Mediterranean Games =

1959 Mediterranean Games football tournament
Tournament details
- Host country: Lebanon
- City: Beirut
- Dates: 12–23 October 1959
- Teams: 3 (from 2 confederations)
- Venue: 1 (in 1 host city)

Final positions
- Champions: Italy Amateurs (1st title)
- Runners-up: Turkey Amateurs
- Third place: Lebanon

Tournament statistics
- Matches played: 6
- Goals scored: 18 (3 per match)
- Top scorer(s): (Italy) Marcello Sanzani (4 goals)

The 1959 Mediterranean Games football tournament was the 3rd edition of the Mediterranean Games men's football tournament. The football tournament was held in Beirut, Lebanon between 12 and 23 October 1959 as part of the 1959 Mediterranean Games.

== Participating teams ==
The following countries have participated for the final tournament:

Federation	Nation
AFC Asia	Lebanon (hosts)
UEFA Europe	Italy Amateurs; Turkey Amateurs

== Venues ==
Cities	Venues	Capacity
Beirut	Beirut Municipal Stadium	?

== Final tournament ==
All times local : CET (UTC+2)

=== Matches ===
==== 1st leg ====
12 October 1959

Lebanon	0–2	Italy Amateurs
	Report	Benaglia 14'; Cella 65'

Beirut Municipal Stadium, Beirut
Attendance: 15,000
Referee: Raymond Lespineux (Belgium)

14 October 1959

Lebanon	0–3	Turkey Amateurs
	Report	Soydan 23', 57', 81'

Beirut Municipal Stadium, Beirut
Attendance: 7,000
Referee: Andersson (Denmark)

16 October 1959

Italy Amateurs	1–1	Turkey Amateurs
Sanzani 90'	Report	Canlısoy (red card) 40'; Elmastaşoğlu 49'

Beirut Municipal Stadium, Beirut
Attendance: 8,000
Referee: Adem Mitri (Lebanon)

==== 2nd leg ====
18 October 1959

Italy Amateurs	5–0	Lebanon
Sanzani 15', 50', 58'; Benetti 44'; Del Negro 52'	Report

Beirut Municipal Stadium, Beirut
Referee: Sulhi Garan (Turkey)

21 October 1959

Turkey Amateurs	2–1	Lebanon
Elmastaşoğlu 45'; Büyükvardar 72'	Report	Kassabian 78'

Beirut Municipal Stadium, Beirut
Attendance: 7,000
Referee: Francesco Liverani (Italy)

23 October 1959

Turkey Amateurs	1–2	Italy Amateurs
Karakayalı 49'	Report	Benaglia 39'; Benetti 60'

Beirut Municipal Stadium, Beirut
Attendance: 40,000
Referee: Raymond Lespineux (Belgium)

=== Tournament classification ===
Rank	Team	Pld	W	D	L	GF	GA	GD	Pts
1	Italy Amateurs	4	3	1	0	10	2	+8	7
2	Turkey Amateurs	4	2	1	1	7	4	+4	5
3	Lebanon	4	0	0	4	1	12	–11	0

== Statistics ==
=== Goalscorers ===
There were 18 goals scored in 6 matches, for an average of 3 goals per match.

4 goals

- (Italy) Marcello Sanzani

3 goals

- (Turkey) Selim Soydan

2 goals

- (Italy) Renato Benaglia
- (Italy) Bruno Benetti
- (Turkey) Ayhan Elmastaşoğlu

1 goal

- (Italy) Giancarlo Cella
- (Italy) Italo Del Negro
- (Lebanon) Apo Kassabian
- (Turkey) Can Cihan Büyükvardar
- (Turkey) Cengiz Karakayalı
