= Lebanon national football team =

Men's association football team

Lebanon
- Nickname(s): رجال الأرز, Rijāl al-Arz (The Cedars)
- Association: Lebanese Football Association (LFA)
- Confederation: AFC (Asia)
- Sub-confederation: WAFF (West Asia)
- Head coach: Madjid Bougherra
- Captain: Mostafa Matar
- Most caps: Hassan Maatouk (123)
- Top scorer: Hassan Maatouk (26)
- Home stadium: Camille Chamoun Sports City Stadium
- FIFA code: LBN
First colours	Second colours

FIFA ranking
- Current: 111 ▲1 (18 November 2026)
- Highest: 77 (September 2018)
- Lowest: 178 (April–May 2011)

First international
- Mandatory Palestine 5–1 Lebanon (Jaffa, Palestine; 27 April 1940)

Biggest win
- Lebanon 11–1 Philippines (Tokyo, Japan; 6 October 1967)

Biggest defeat
- Iraq 8–0 Lebanon (Baghdad, Iraq; 25 November 1959); Qatar 8–0 Lebanon (Doha, Qatar; 27 March 1985)

Asian Cup
- Appearances: 3 (first in 2000)
- Best result: Group stage (2000, 2019, 2023)

Arab Cup
- Appearances: 8 (first in 1963)
- Best result: Third place (1963, 1964)

WAFF Championship
- Appearances: 7 (first in 2000)
- Best result: Group stage (2000, 2002, 2004, 2007, 2012, 2013, 2019)
Medal record
Men's football
Arab Cup
Bronze medal – third place	1963 Lebanon	Team
Bronze medal – third place	1964 Kuwait	Team
Arab Games
Bronze medal – third place	1957 Beirut	Team
Bronze medal – third place	1997 Beirut	Team
Mediterranean Games
Bronze medal – third place	1959 Beirut	Team
- Website: the-lfa.com.lb (in Arabic)

The Lebanon national football team (Arabic: منتخب لبنان لكرة القدم) represents Lebanon in men's international association football and is governed by the Lebanese Football Association (LFA). Founded in 1933 as one of the first football governing bodies in the Middle East, the LFA has been a member of FIFA since 1936, the Asian Football Confederation (AFC) since 1964, and a founding member of the West Asian Football Federation (WAFF) since 2000.

Lebanon have never qualified for the FIFA World Cup, but reached the final round of Asian qualification for the 2014 and 2022 tournaments. The team have participated in the AFC Asian Cup three times, first as hosts in 2000 and subsequently in 2019 and 2023. At the 2019 tournament, Lebanon recorded their first Asian Cup victory, defeating North Korea 4–1, but were eliminated in the group stage on the fair play rule. They have also competed in regional tournaments, including the Arab Cup, the WAFF Championship, and the Arab Games.

Lebanon played their first FIFA-recognised international match against Mandatory Palestine in 1940. They regularly participated in regional competitions during the 1950s and 1960s, finishing third at the 1957 Arab Games and the 1963 and 1964 Arab Cups. The Lebanese Civil War disrupted the team's activities between 1975 and 1990, leading to withdrawals from several international competitions. After the war, Lebanon returned to more regular international play, finishing third at the 1997 Arab Games and hosting the 2000 Asian Cup.

The team are nicknamed "the Cedars" (Arabic: رجال الأرز), after the cedar of Lebanon, the country's national symbol. Their traditional home kit is predominantly red, while their away kit is usually white, reflecting the colours of the Lebanese flag. The team play their home matches at various stadiums across the country, most notably the Camille Chamoun Sports City Stadium in Beirut. Lebanon reached their highest FIFA World Ranking of 77th in September 2018, during a 16-match unbeaten run. Hassan Maatouk holds the national records for both appearances and goals, having made 123 appearances and scored 26 goals.

== History ==
=== 1933–1947: Formation and early matches ===
Lebanon was one of the first nations in the Middle East to establish a formal administrative body for association football. (Note: The football associations of Iran, Egypt, Turkey, and Israel are older.) On 22 March 1933, representatives from 13 football clubs gathered in the Minet El Hosn district of Beirut to form the Lebanese Football Association (LFA). The LFA was initially led by Hussein Sejaan, and became a member of FIFA in 1936.

On 3 February 1934, the LFA organised a training camp for 22 players from Beirut in preparation for a friendly match against the Romanian club CA Timișoara (TAC). The players were divided into two teams and competed against each other at the American University of Beirut (AUB) field. However, the scheduled match against TAC on 18 February was cancelled due to financial disputes between the LFA and AUB, which had organised the event. Beirut XI eventually faced TAC on 21 November 1935 at the AUB field, losing 3–0. On 29 October 1939, Beirut XI played their first match against Syria's Damascus XI in Beirut, losing 5–4, before winning the return fixture in Damascus 6–1 on 14 November. Between 1939 and 1963, the two sides met in 16 unofficial matches, with Beirut XI recording seven wins, two draws, and seven defeats.

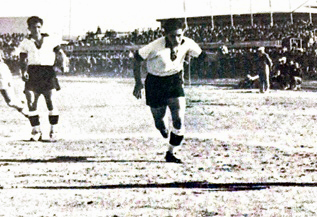
Lebanese forward Camille Cordahi during the 1940 match against Mandatory Palestine

Lebanon played their first official FIFA-recognised match on 27 April 1940 against Mandatory Palestine at the Maccabiah Stadium in Palestine, before an estimated 6,000 to 10,000 spectators. Mandatory Palestine dominated the first half, scoring four goals. In the second half, Lebanese forward Camille Cordahi, assisted by Muhieddine Jaroudi, scored Lebanon's first official international goal, before Mandatory Palestine added a fifth to win 5–1.

Lebanon played their first official match against Syria on 26 April 1942, losing 2–1 in Beirut for the Coupe Hauteclocque. Donated in 1939 by French diplomat Jean de Hauteclocque, the trophy had originally been intended for matches between Beirut XI and Damascus XI and had been held by the Syrian Football Association since then; at the Syrian federation's request, the LFA agreed to contest it between the two national teams instead. Although a two-legged home-and-away tie was initially proposed, only the Beirut fixture took place. Played at the AUB field before 3,000 spectators, the match saw Lebanon coached by Abed Traboulsi and captained by Labib Majdalani. Lebanon played two additional friendlies against Syria in 1947, losing 4–1 in Beirut on 4 May, and 1–0 in Aleppo on 18 May.

=== 1953–1963: Early international tournaments ===
Under Austrian coach Vinzenz Dittrich, Lebanon made their international tournament debut at the inaugural Arab Games in Egypt in August 1953. After finishing bottom of their group behind Jordan and Syria, they secured fifth place with a 9–1 victory over Palestine. Over the next two years, Lebanon gained experience in high-profile home friendlies, including a 4–1 defeat to Hungary in February 1956—in which Ferenc Puskás scored twice—and unofficial fixtures against European clubs Dynamo Moscow, Leipzig, and Spartak Trnava in 1957. That same year, Joseph Abou Mrad scored the lone goal in a 1–0 win over Romanian side Energia Flacăra Ploiești to inaugurate Beirut's Sports City Stadium.

Hosting the 1957 Arab Games in October, Lebanon topped their group unbeaten—highlighted by a 6–3 win over Jordan featuring braces from Abou Mrad and Mardik Tchaparian alongside goals from Robert Chehade and Levon Altounian. Although they lost 4–2 to Tunisia in the semi-finals, Morocco's withdrawal from the third-place play-off earned Lebanon their first major tournament medal. Results proved far tougher in 1959: as hosts of the Mediterranean Games, Lebanon lost all four matches against amateur sides from Italy and Turkey, (Note: Both Italian and Turkish sides were made up of amateur players.) finishing third and last in the three-team tournament to receive the bronze medal. Later that year, under English coach Harry Wright, Lebanon entered their first Olympic qualifying campaign, but withdrew before facing Turkey after heavy defeats to Iraq (3–0 at home and 8–0 away).

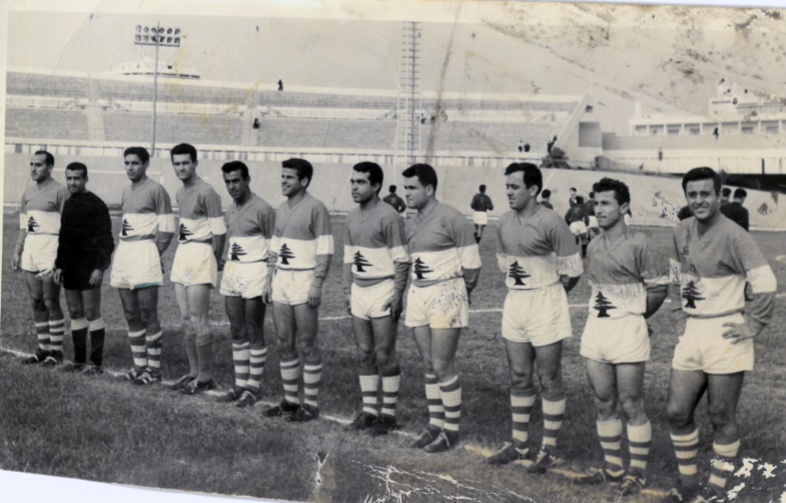
Lebanon's lineup at the 1963 Arab Cup

Under Joseph Nalbandian, Lebanon placed fourth in the six-team single round-robin at the 1961 Arab Games in Morocco, where wins over Kuwait (4–0) and Saudi Arabia (7–1) were offset by losses to Libya, the United Arab Republic (UAR), and the hosts. In April 1963, Beirut hosted the inaugural Arab Cup, a tournament first proposed in 1957 by Lebanese journalist Nassif Majdalani and LFA secretary-general Izzat Al Turk. Competing in a five-team round-robin, Lebanon opened with a 6–0 rout of Kuwait featuring a Tchaparian hat-trick, and also beat Jordan 5–0, but narrow defeats to Syria (3–2) and eventual champions Tunisia (1–0) left them in third place. Later that year, at the 1963 Mediterranean Games in Italy, Lebanon defeated Malta 2–0 after losses to Spain and Turkey, before withdrawing over a venue dispute when their final group match against the UAR was abandoned due to a waterlogged pitch.

=== 1964–1971: AFC membership and continued regional participation ===
In March 1964, Lebanon won their first—albeit unofficial—trophy by going unbeaten at the 1964 Tripoli Fair Tournament in Libya ahead of hosts Libya and B sides from Sudan, Morocco, and Malta. Five months later, in August 1964, Lebanon formally joined the Asian Football Confederation (AFC).

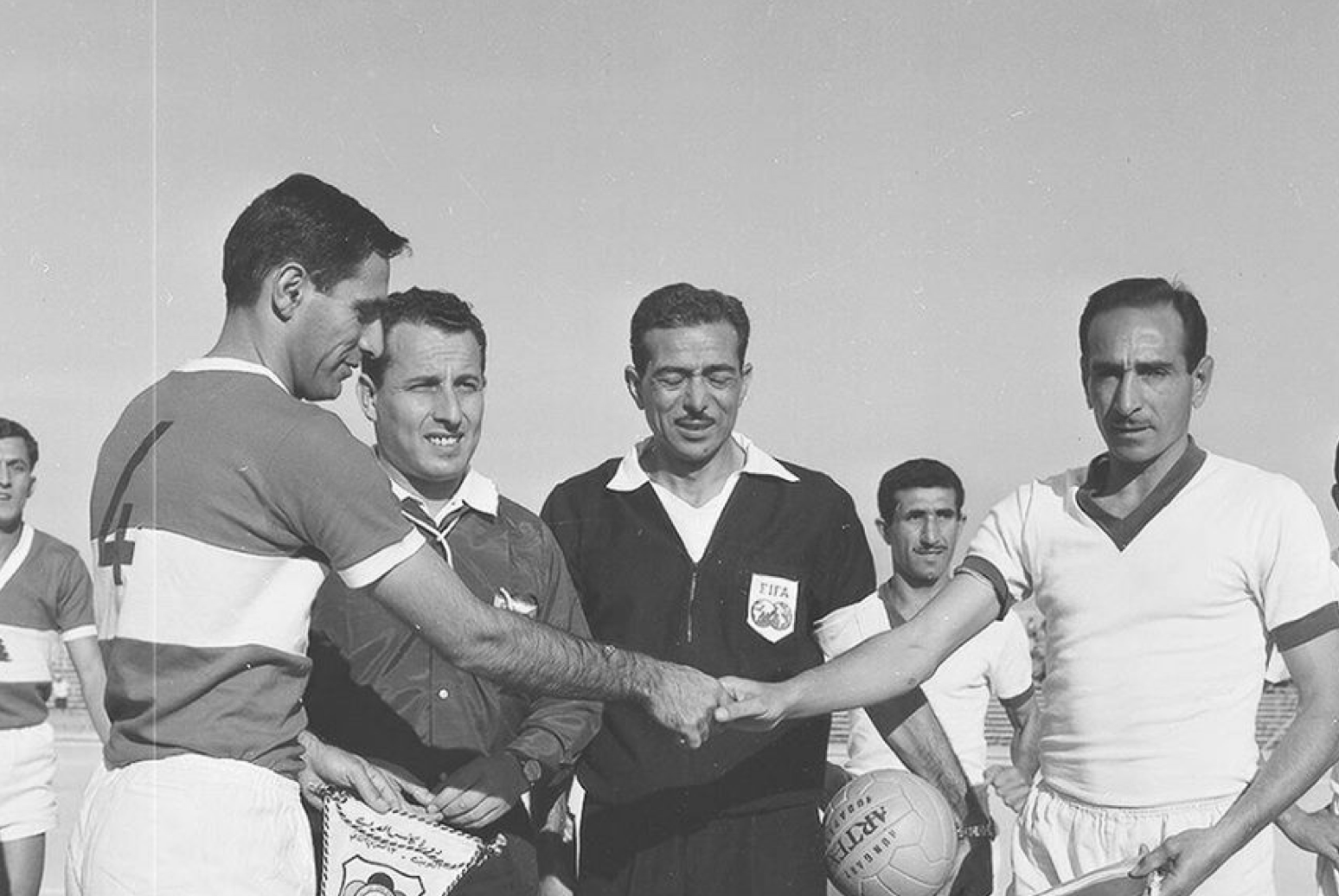
Lebanon's captain, Joseph Abou Mrad (left), shaking hands with Iraq's captain before their match at the 1964 Arab Cup

Lebanon remained a regular fixture in Arab regional competitions through the mid-1960s. At the 1964 Arab Cup in Kuwait, a final-day 3–2 victory over the hosts secured a second consecutive third-place finish despite earlier losses to Iraq and Libya and a goalless draw with Jordan. Following a group-stage exit at the 1965 Arab Games in Cairo—and a decision in November 1965 to decline entry into the 1968 AFC Asian Cup qualifiers—Lebanon reached the semi-finals of the 1966 Arab Cup in Iraq unbeaten in their group. A 1–0 semi-final loss to Syria and a 6–1 defeat by Libya in the third-place match left them fourth overall.

During the 1968 Olympic qualifiers in Tokyo, Nalbandian stepped in as coach after Hungarian manager József Albert was unable to obtain a Japanese visa. After taking a single point from their opening three matches against South Vietnam, South Korea, and Japan, Lebanon closed with back-to-back victories: an 11–1 win over the Philippines on 6 October—featuring four goals from Altounian and a hat-trick from Samir Nassar, which remains the national team's largest win—and a 5–2 win over Taiwan, finishing third out of six teams.

Now coached by former captain Joseph Abou Mrad, Lebanon fell narrowly short in two major qualifying campaigns in 1971. In the 1972 Olympic qualifiers, FIFA replaced a planned group stage in Tehran with knockout ties due to Iranian visa issues; Lebanon defeated Iraq 1–0 in Beirut and lost 1–0 in Baghdad before losing a neutral-venue play-off 2–1 in Istanbul. Later that December, Lebanon made their Asian Cup qualifying debut in the Western Zone tournament in Kuwait. A 3–0 allocation-match defeat to Bahrain placed them in Group B alongside Kuwait and Syria, where they lost 1–0 to Kuwait before beating Syria 3–2 to reach the semi-finals. Needing a victory to qualify for the finals, Lebanon lost 4–1 to Iraq and concluded their campaign with a 2–0 consolation win over Jordan in the third-place match.

=== 1975–1988: Civil war and international disruptions ===
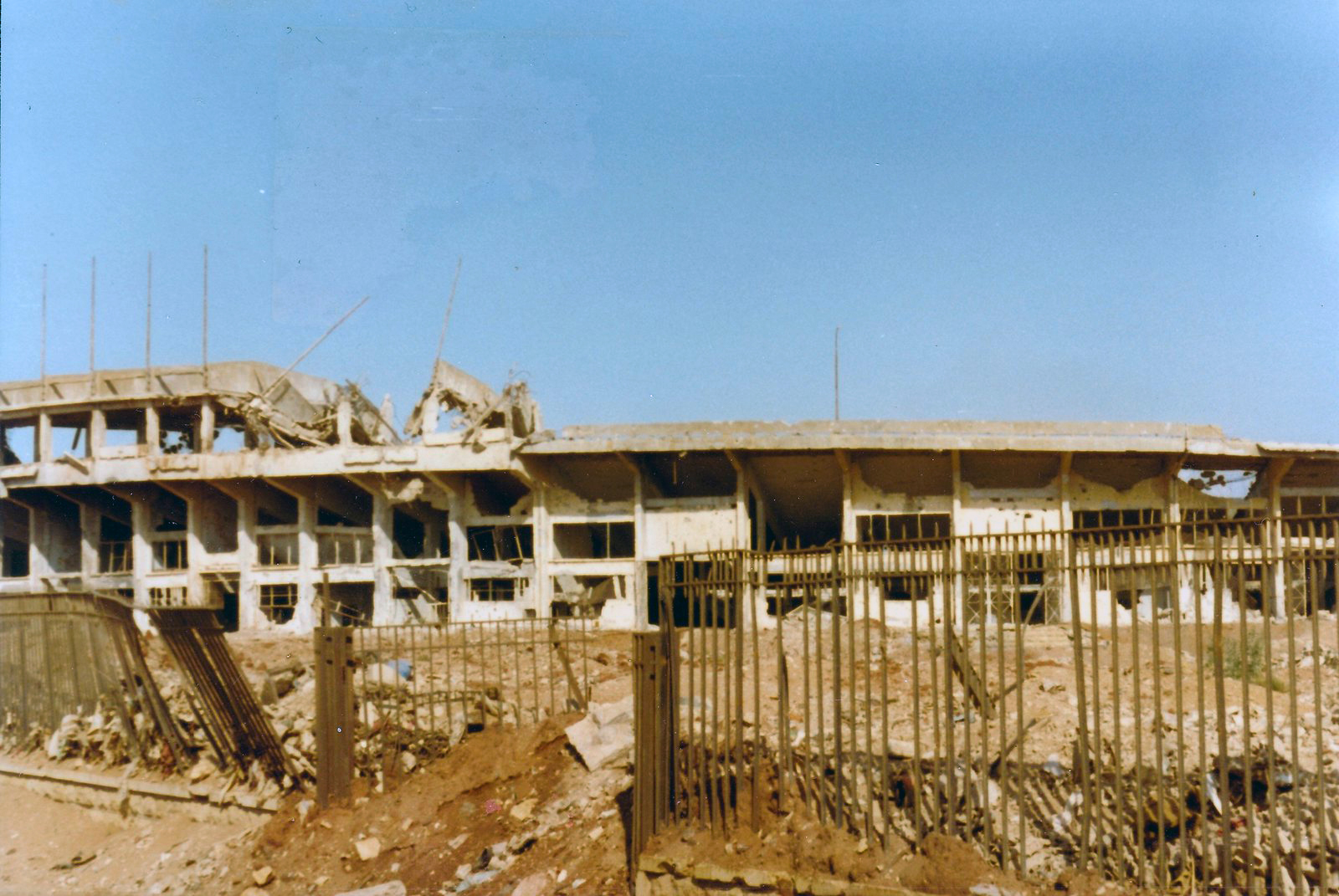
The destroyed Camille Chamoun Sports City Stadium during the Lebanese Civil War in 1982

Despite the Lebanese Civil War (1975–1990), the national football team continued participating in international competitions, though with significant disruptions. Ahead of qualification for the 1976 Asian Cup, in which Lebanon had originally agreed to host their group, the team withdrew due to the civil war. A notable incident occurred in 1979 during preparations for a match against South Korea, when Joseph Nalbandian, secretary-general of the LFA, was detained for six hours in the basement of the Kataeb Regulatory Forces' War Council building, the paramilitary wing of the Kataeb Party. Despite this political interference, the national team proceeded with their travel to South Korea for the match.

The team faced further challenges during the 1980 Asian Cup qualifiers, held in Abu Dhabi in November 1979. After a 0–0 draw against the United Arab Emirates (UAE), Lebanon needed a victory over Syria to secure qualification for the final tournament. The decisive match proved controversial, with refereeing decisions including a disputed penalty awarded to Syria, a disallowed Lebanese goal, and the sending off of three Lebanese players. These incidents contributed to Lebanon's 1–0 defeat, resulting in their elimination from the competition.

Further disruptions followed in the mid-1980s Asian Cup and FIFA World Cup qualification cycles. Lebanon withdrew from the 1984 Asian Cup qualifiers despite being scheduled to compete in Saudi Arabia in October 1984, after being unable to depart Beirut due to security concerns, with the LFA citing "reasons beyond its control". Similarly, in the team's first attempt at qualifying for the World Cup in 1986, Lebanon played four matches in March 1985 against Iraq and Qatar before withdrawing due to the escalation of the civil war, with FIFA later annulling all results.

At the 1987 Mediterranean Games in Latakia, Syria in September, Lebanon participated in the football tournament but struggled competitively. After an initial 0–0 draw against San Marino, defeats to Turkey Olympic (1–0) and hosts Syria (6–1) saw the team finish third in their group and fail to progress beyond the group stage. Lebanon's final major tournament appearance during the civil war came at the 1988 Arab Cup. After qualifying through matches in Aleppo, including a 2–1 loss to Syria and a 0–0 draw with Palestine, Lebanon competed in the finals in Jordan. Drawn alongside Egypt, Iraq, Tunisia, and Saudi Arabia, the team recorded one win, two draws, and one defeat, finishing third in the group and failing to advance to the knockout stages.

=== 1993–2004: Post-war revival and 2000 Asian Cup hosting ===
Lebanon returned to international competition in 1993, entering the qualifiers for the 1994 World Cup under coach Adnan Al Sharqi. Their 57-year gap between joining FIFA in 1936 and entering a full World Cup qualifying campaign in 1993 was the longest at the time; the record was surpassed by the Philippines three years later with a gap of 68 years. Lebanon finished third in their group with two wins, four draws, and two losses, failing to advance.

Under Terry Yorath, Lebanon's first foreign manager after the civil war, the team began their qualification campaign for the 1996 Asian Cup. Despite two wins against Turkmenistan and only one defeat, against Kuwait, Lebanon were eliminated by a single point. In February 1997, Lebanon rose 10 places in the FIFA rankings and were named Asian Team of the Month. In qualification for the 1998 World Cup, they were drawn with Kuwait and Singapore, finishing second in their group with four points and failing to advance. In July 1997, Lebanon hosted the eighth Arab Games at Beirut's rebuilt Sports City Stadium, advancing unbeaten from their group before losing 3–2 to Syria via a golden goal in the semi-finals. They subsequently defeated a reserve Kuwait side 3–1 in the third-place match to claim the bronze medal. Across his tenure from 1995 to 1997, Yorath won 15 of his 31 matches in charge.

Lebanon's starting line-up against Iran at the 2000 Asian Cup

Lebanon hosted the 2000 Asian Cup despite FIFA concerns over stadium conditions. Coached by Josip Skoblar and captained by Jamal Taha, Lebanon were drawn with Iran, Iraq, and Thailand in Group A. Five members of the 23-man squad were Brazilian-born players of Lebanese descent. Lebanon opened the tournament on 12 October, with a 4–0 defeat to Iran at the Camille Chamoun Sports City Stadium in front of 52,418 spectators. In the following match against Iraq, Lebanon recovered from a two-goal deficit to draw 2–2 through goals from Abbas Chahrour and Moussa Hojeij, earning their first point in the competition. A 1–1 draw against Thailand in the final group match, with Luís Fernandes scoring Lebanon's equaliser, was not enough to advance, as they finished bottom of the group with two points.

In May 2000, the LFA became one of the founding members of the West Asian Football Federation (WAFF). One year later, managed by Theo Bücker, Lebanon competed in the first round of qualification for the 2002 World Cup against Pakistan, Sri Lanka, and Thailand. Led in attack by Roda Antar, Haitham Zein, Vardan Ghazaryan, and Gilberto, they scored a group-high 26 goals in six matches, yet finished second and were eliminated.

Under Richard Tardy, Lebanon entered the qualifiers for the 2004 Asian Cup. Before their away match against North Korea, the Lebanese delegation reportedly faced poor accommodation and inadequate training conditions, with their training field allegedly containing goats and sheep. Lebanon finished third in their qualifying group with four points. In the second round of qualification for the 2006 World Cup, Lebanon were drawn with South Korea, Vietnam, and the Maldives. Coached by Mahmoud Hamoud, they finished second in the group and were eliminated.

=== 2006–2014: World Cup qualifying progress and match-fixing scandal ===
In the 2007 Asian Cup qualifiers, Lebanon were drawn with Australia, Bahrain, and Kuwait, prompting Australian-born defender Buddy Farah to return to the squad. However, before their August 2006 fixture against Bahrain, the AFC accepted the LFA's withdrawal request due to the 2006 Lebanon War, which had forced several players to flee their homes. Lebanon subsequently beat India 6–3 on aggregate in the first round of 2010 World Cup qualifying, but finished bottom of their third-round group without a point against Saudi Arabia, Singapore, and Uzbekistan. Similarly, in 2011 Asian Cup qualifying, they overcame the Maldives 6–1 on aggregate in the preliminary round (Note: Turkmenistan, Myanmar, and North Korea, respectively the lowest, third-lowest, and fourth-lowest-ranked teams in Asia, did not take part in the preliminary round on account of having participated in the 2008 and 2010 AFC Challenge Cup, which acted as qualifying tournaments to the 2011 AFC Asian Cup. Only the Maldives and Lebanon, respectively the second-lowest and fifth-lowest ranked teams, were involved in the preliminary round.) before finishing last in a group with China, Syria, and Vietnam.

Reappointed in 2008, Emile Rustom guided Lebanon past Bangladesh (4–2 on aggregate) into the third round of 2014 World Cup qualifying, but resigned shortly after the draw citing administrative disputes, leading to Theo Bücker's return in August 2011. After opening the group with a 6–0 loss to South Korea, Lebanon beat the UAE 3–1 at home and drew 2–2 with Kuwait before more than 30,000 fans at Sports City Stadium—their first home fixture with spectators officially permitted since 2005—in a match repeatedly interrupted by crowd trouble. A 1–0 away win in Kuwait City—Lebanon's first there—was followed on 15 November 2011 by a 2–1 home victory over South Korea before over 40,000 spectators, with goals from Ali Al Saadi and Abbas Ali Atwi securing Lebanon's first-ever win against South Korea and a maiden berth in the final round of World Cup qualifying.

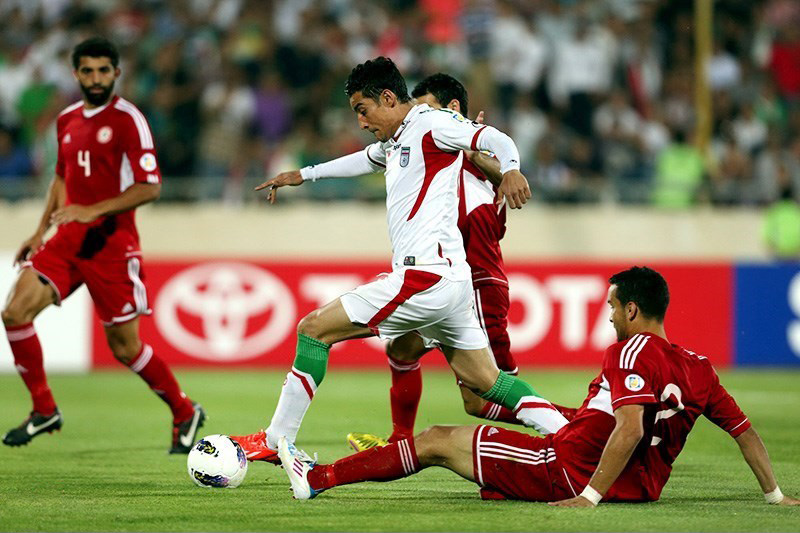
Lebanon against Iran during the 2014 World Cup qualification

Drawn with South Korea, Uzbekistan, Iran, and Qatar in the fourth round, Lebanon stayed in contention with a 1–0 home win over Iran on 11 September 2012 through a header by captain Roda Antar. However, the campaign was overshadowed by the 2013 Lebanese football match-fixing scandal, in which internationals Ramez Dayoub and Mahmoud El Ali received lifetime bans from the LFA; Lebanon's 1–0 defeat to Qatar was among the fixed matches, with Dayoub intentionally passing to the Qatari striker for the winning goal. Lebanon remained mathematically alive until the penultimate matchday, when a 97th-minute South Korean equaliser in Beirut eliminated them.

During 2015 Asian Cup qualifying against Iran, Thailand, and Kuwait, Giuseppe Giannini succeeded Bücker as head coach. Lebanon finished third in their group with two wins, two draws, and two defeats, narrowly missing out on qualification to China on goal difference in the third-placed ranking. Following a 5–0 friendly defeat to Qatar in October 2014, Giannini was dismissed.

=== 2015–2022: Asian Cup return and 2022 World Cup qualifying ===
Miodrag Radulović was appointed the team's new coach in 2015, and led Lebanon in the 2018 World Cup qualifications, played between June 2015 and March 2016. Drawn with South Korea, Kuwait, Myanmar, and Laos, Lebanon finished second in their group and advanced to the third round of qualification for the 2019 Asian Cup. Placed in a group with North Korea, Hong Kong, and Malaysia, Lebanon topped the group with five wins and a draw to qualify for the Asian Cup for the first time through qualification. (Note: Lebanon's first participation was in the 2000 edition, which they hosted.) Captain Hassan Maatouk played a key role in the campaign, scoring five goals in six matches. Between 29 March 2016 and 9 September 2018, Lebanon also recorded a 16-match unbeaten run, winning eight and drawing eight games, and reached their highest FIFA ranking of 77th in September 2018.

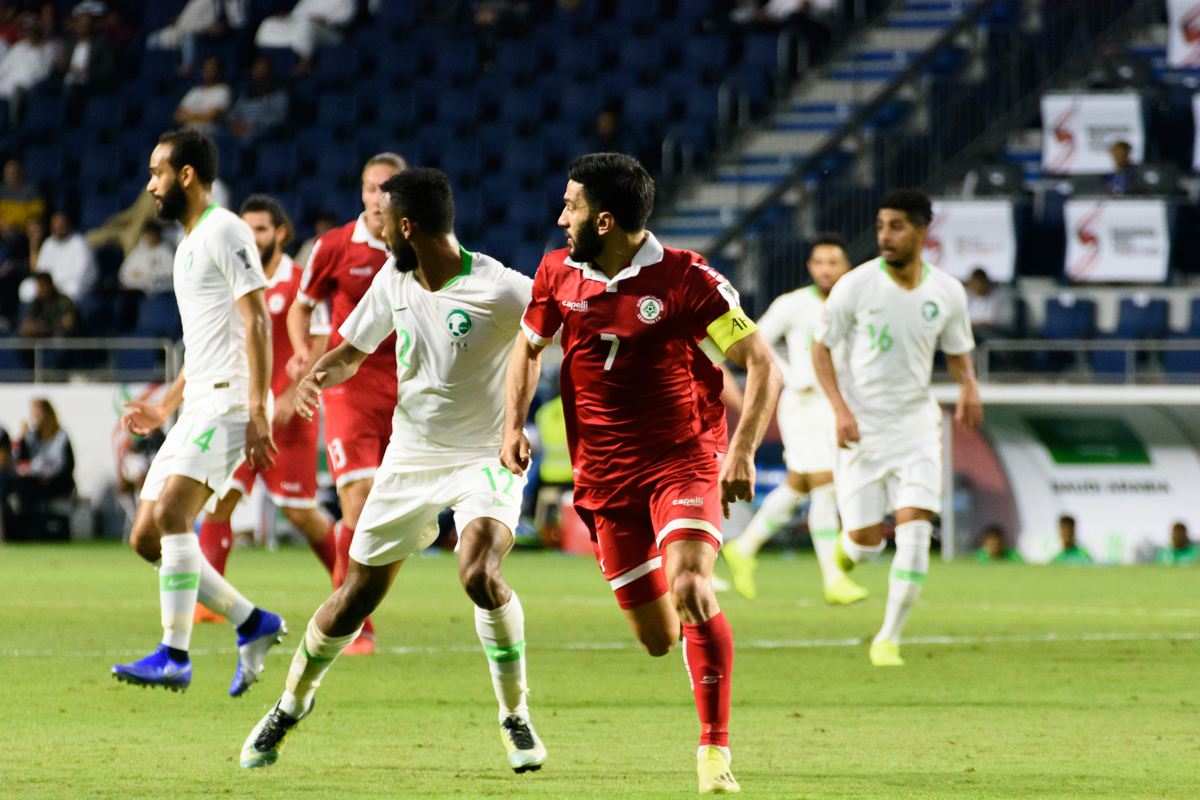
Lebanon in the group stage match against Saudi Arabia at the 2019 Asian Cup

At the 2019 Asian Cup, Lebanon's 23-man squad included nine players born outside the country as part of the Lebanese diaspora. Drawn in Group E, Lebanon opened the tournament with a 2–0 defeat against eventual champions Qatar; Ali Hamam had scored from a corner in the first half, though the goal was controversially disallowed for a foul. A second 2–0 defeat, against Saudi Arabia, left Lebanon needing a four-goal victory over North Korea in their final group match to have a chance of progressing. Lebanon won 4–1 thanks to a brace from Hilal El-Helwe, securing the country's first-ever Asian Cup victory. However, they were eliminated on the fair play rule after finishing level on points and goal difference with Vietnam in the third-place ranking, having received two more yellow cards.

Liviu Ciobotariu was appointed head coach for the joint qualification campaign for the 2022 World Cup and 2023 Asian Cup. Lebanon began the second round of qualification for the 2022 World Cup against South Korea, North Korea, Turkmenistan, and Sri Lanka. Following the postponement of fixtures due to the COVID-19 pandemic, former captain Jamal Taha took charge in 2020. North Korea's withdrawal in May 2021 led FIFA to annul their results, moving Lebanon from third to second place in the group; Lebanon ultimately advanced to the final round of World Cup qualification for the second time and qualified for the 2023 Asian Cup for the third time.

Under Ivan Hašek, Lebanon competed in the final round of 2022 World Cup qualification against Iran, South Korea, the United Arab Emirates, Iraq, and Syria. After earning five points from their opening four matches (all away from home), including a 3–2 win over Syria, Lebanon were considered an "early surprise" of the qualifiers, sitting in the play-off qualifying third place as the lowest-ranked team in the round. They narrowly missed out on another positive result in their first home match, leading Iran 1–0 until stoppage time before conceding twice late to lose 2–1. Lebanon subsequently earned only one point from their next five matches (including four at home) and finished bottom of the group. Midway through the campaign, Lebanon also competed at the 2021 FIFA Arab Cup in Qatar, the first edition organised by FIFA. Having qualified via a 1–0 play-off win over Djibouti in June, defeats to Egypt and Algeria eliminated them before a 1–0 victory over Sudan left them third in their group. The World Cup qualifying campaign was later featured in FIFA and Netflix's documentary series Captains.

=== 2023–present: Third Asian Cup and subsequent campaigns ===
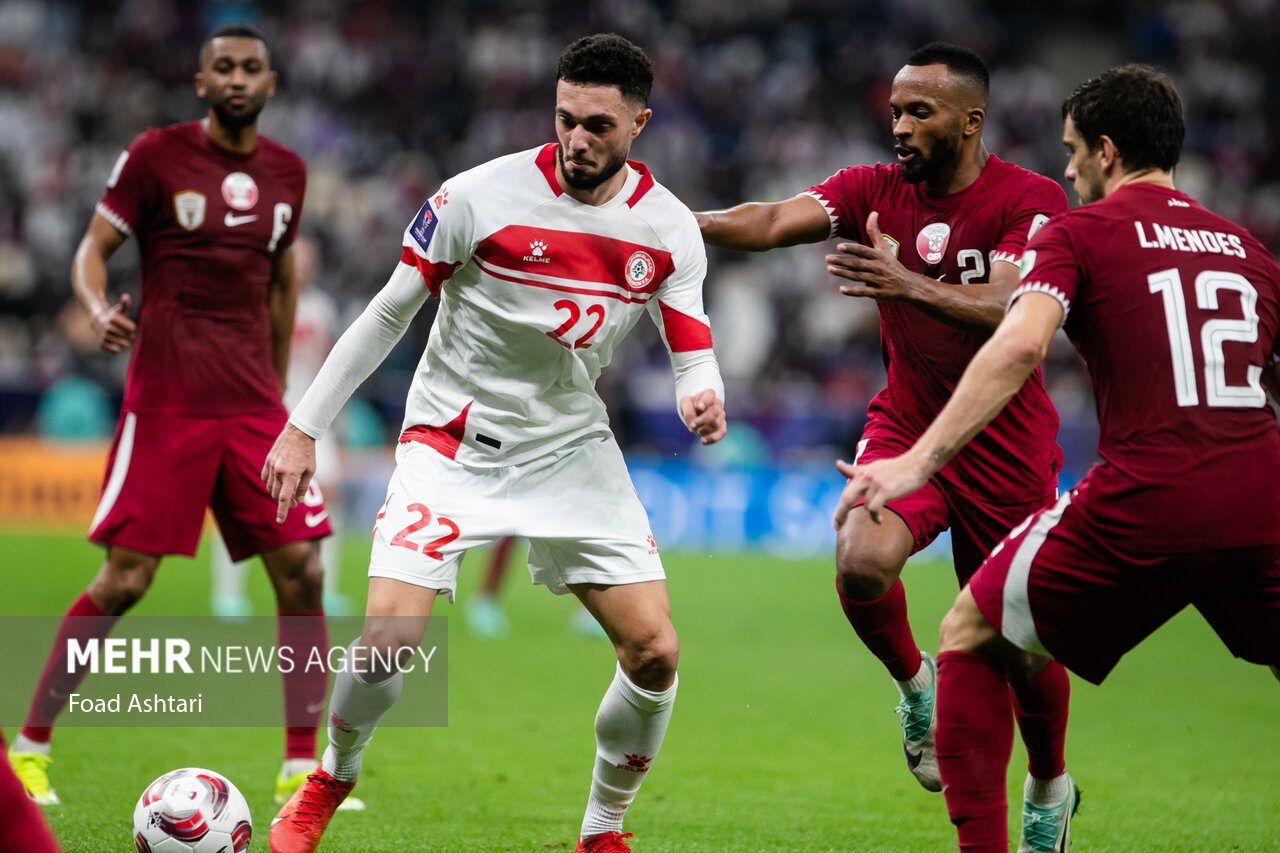
Lebanon facing Qatar in the opening match of the 2023 Asian Cup

Ahead of the 2023 Asian Cup, played in January 2024, Lebanon finished runners-up at the 2023 Intercontinental Cup, reached the 2023 SAFF Championship semi-finals, and placed third at the 2023 King's Cup. Under returning head coach Radulović, Lebanon called up 12 foreign-born players for the Asian Cup, continuing a trend from the 2019 edition. Drawn into Group A alongside hosts and defending champions Qatar, China, and debutants Tajikistan, Lebanon lost the opening match 3–0 to Qatar at Lusail Stadium before 82,490 spectators. A goalless draw with China left knockout qualification dependent on their final group match against Tajikistan. Although Bassel Jradi put Lebanon ahead early in the second half, Kassem El Zein was sent off in the 52nd minute, and two late goals by Tajikistan sealed a 2–1 defeat, eliminating Lebanon as they finished bottom of the group with one point.

In the second round of qualification for the 2026 World Cup, Lebanon were drawn with Australia, Palestine, and Bangladesh. Recording one win, three draws, and two defeats, they finished third and advanced to the final round of qualification for the 2027 Asian Cup. The campaign also marked the international retirement of captain Hassan Maatouk, who finished as Lebanon's all-time top goalscorer and most-capped player with 26 goals in 123 appearances.

Drawn alongside Yemen, Bhutan, and Brunei in the final round of Asian Cup qualification, Lebanon led their group with 13 points from five matches (four wins and a draw) by November 2025. Later that month, however, a defeat to Sudan eliminated them in 2025 Arab Cup qualification, leading to Radulović's dismissal and the appointment of Algerian manager Madjid Bougherra in January 2026. Lebanon's decisive final Asian Cup qualifier against Yemen—originally scheduled for March 2026—was postponed to June due to security concerns arising from the 2026 Lebanon war. Requiring only a draw to qualify, Lebanon lost 2–0 and missed out on the tournament.

== Team image ==
=== Nickname and kits ===
Lebanon's kit over the years

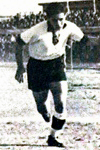
1940

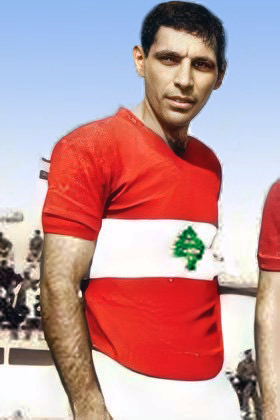
1966

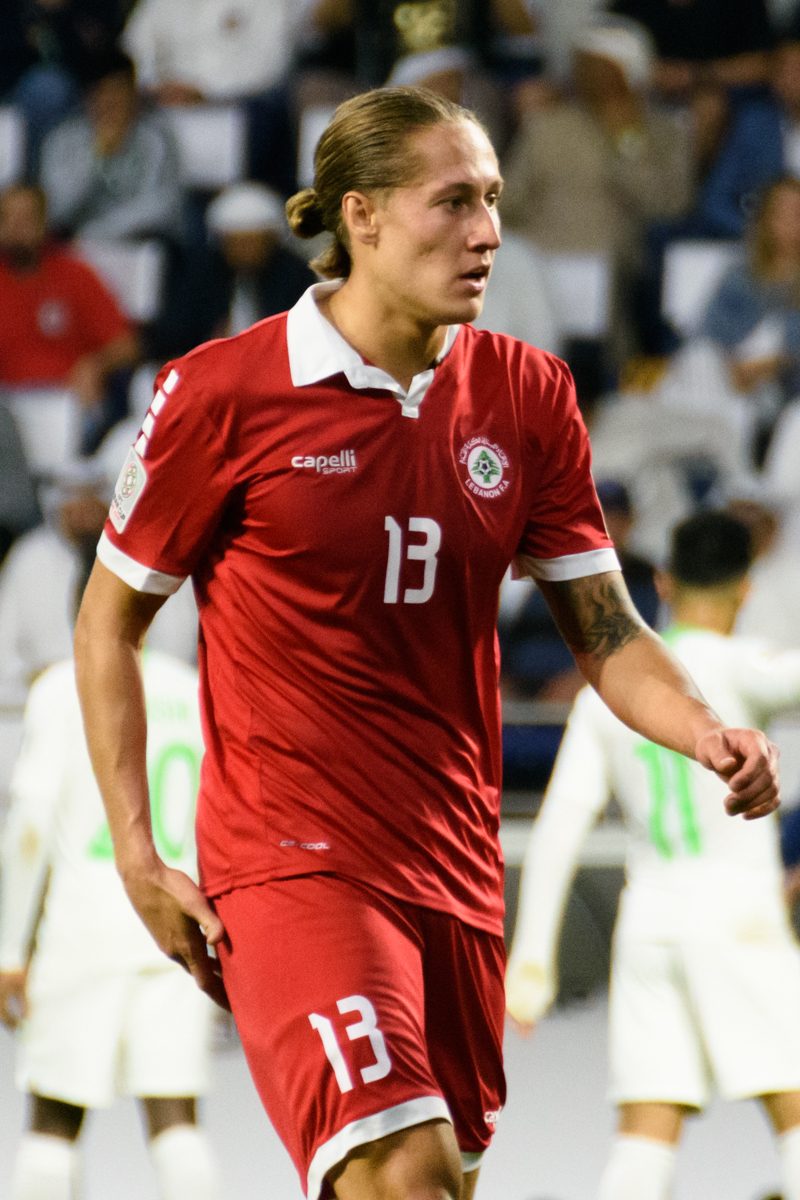
2019

Lebanon are known as "the Cedars" (Arabic: رجال الأرز, romanized: Rijāl al-Arz) by fans and the media, after the cedar tree, the country's national symbol. The national team traditionally wear red as their primary colour and white as their secondary colour, originating from the national flag of Lebanon (red, white, and green); green is sometimes reserved for the goalkeeper. At home, Lebanon usually wear a red shirt, shorts, and socks, with white details; the away kit is predominantly white with red details.

During their first unofficial match in 1935, Lebanon wore white shirts with the Lebanese cedar and the association's name on the chest, black shorts, and white socks; the goalkeeper wore a black shirt and white trousers. In 1940, for their first FIFA-sanctioned game against Mandatory Palestine, Lebanon wore a white kit with a black collar, along with black shorts and striped socks. During the 1960s, Lebanon wore a red shirt with a white horizontal band in the centre featuring a green cedar tree; the shorts were white, and the socks were red-and-white-striped.

In the 2000 Asian Cup, Lebanon wore a red Adidas shirt with white details on the sides and a white collar, white shorts, and red socks. In the 2019 campaign, Lebanon wore a red kit with white details and a white collar, manufactured by Capelli Sport, a sports brand founded by Lebanese-born entrepreneur George Altirs. The Lebanese cedar was featured under the team logo in a darker shade of red. Since December 2023, the team kit has been manufactured by Kelme. Previous manufacturers include Diadora and Adidas.

=== Home stadium ===
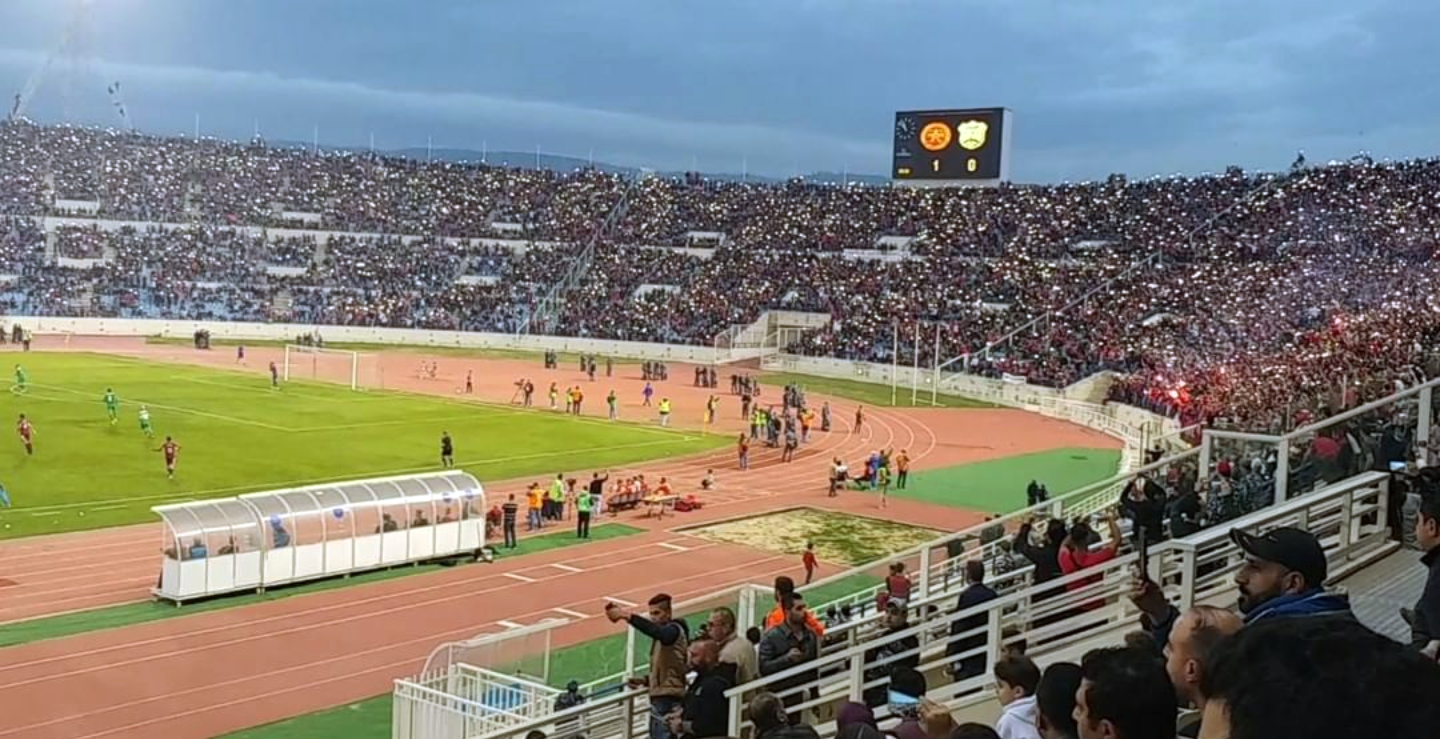
The Camille Chamoun Sports City Stadium in 2018

The Lebanese national team play their home games in various stadiums throughout the country. The team's main venue is the Camille Chamoun Sports City Stadium. Built in 1957 during the presidency of Camille Chamoun, it is the country's largest stadium with 49,500 seats. Its inaugural game was in 1957, when the national team played Energia Flacăra Ploiești and won 1–0 with a goal from Joseph Abou Mrad. It was the main venue for the 2000 Asian Cup; six matches were played there, including the opening match and the final. In 2011, the stadium hosted the 2–1 victory against South Korea in 2014 World Cup qualification, sending Lebanon to the final round of qualification for the first time before more than 40,000 spectators.

The national team also play in other stadiums such as the Saida Municipal Stadium in Sidon. Built over the sea, the stadium was one of the venues used for the 2000 Asian Cup. Other stadiums used by the national team include the Beirut Municipal Stadium and the Tripoli Municipal Stadium. From 2023 onwards, regional conflict forced the LFA to stage home qualifiers at neutral venues abroad, including in Australia and Qatar.

=== Supporters and rivalries ===
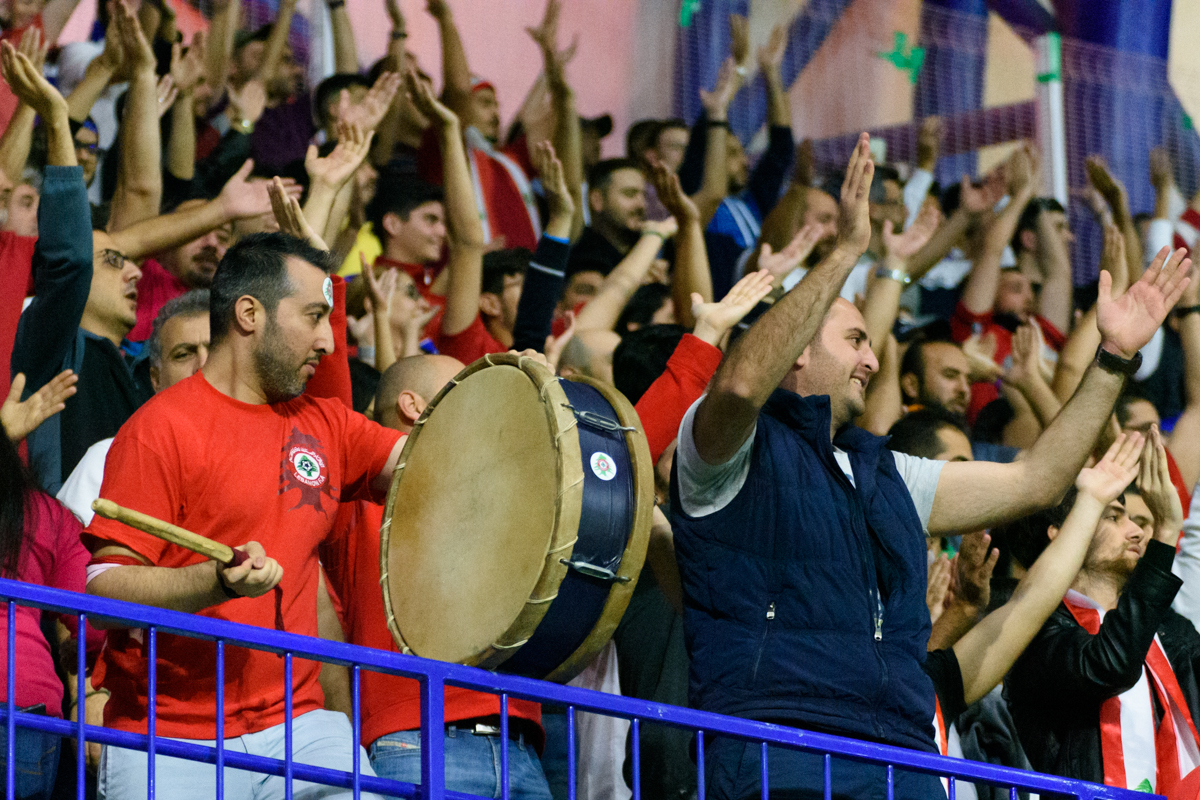
Lebanese fans supporting the national team at the 2019 Asian Cup

Domestic club football in Lebanon has historically been associated with political and sectarian identities, and club matches have often been accompanied by political chanting and crowd disturbances. Following recurring incidents, spectators were officially barred from attending matches at the Camille Chamoun Sports City Stadium from 2005 until October 2011. In contrast, major national team fixtures have periodically drawn cross-sectarian support; during the 2–1 victory over South Korea in November 2011, chanting in the stands focused on the national side rather than sectarian affiliations. However, public support declined sharply following the 2013 match-fixing scandal, leading to a sharp drop in support. Ahead of the 2019 Asian Cup, Prime Minister Saad Hariri called on the squad to "be one hand" and set aside sectarian divisions.

Political and security crises have also restricted home attendance; during nationwide protests in November 2019, Lebanon's home World Cup qualifier against South Korea in Beirut was played behind closed doors on security grounds. Away from Lebanon, the national team have frequently drawn vocal backing from the Lebanese diaspora, including expatriate crowds in the United Arab Emirates at the 2019 Asian Cup and large, vocal crowds in Western Sydney—home to a substantial Lebanese Australian community—during a March 2024 World Cup qualifier against Australia.

Lebanon have a longstanding rivalry with neighbouring Syria, sometimes described as a Levant derby (Arabic: ديربي الشام, romanized: Dīrbī al-Shām), with meetings dating back to the unofficial Beirut XI–Damascus XI fixtures from 1939 and their first official match in the 1942 Coupe Hauteclocque. Fixtures between the two sides have occasionally been disrupted by crowd unrest; in March 2022, a 3–0 World Cup qualifying defeat to Syria at the Saida Municipal Stadium in Sidon was halted several times after clashes in the stands and stone-throwing outside the venue prompted intervention by Lebanese security forces.

=== Media ===
In 2022, FIFA released Captains, an eight-part sports docuseries produced by Fulwell 73 following six national team captains in their respective 2022 World Cup qualification campaigns. Hassan Maatouk, representing Lebanon, starred in the first season alongside Thiago Silva (Brazil), Luka Modrić (Croatia), Pierre-Emerick Aubameyang (Gabon), Andre Blake (Jamaica), and Brian Kaltak (Vanuatu). It was released by Netflix, and also shown on FIFA's own streaming platform, FIFA+.

== Results and fixtures ==
As of 17 November 2026, the Lebanon national team have played 413 official matches, recording 119 wins, 107 draws, and 187 defeats. The team have scored 496 goals and conceded 611. Lebanon's largest victory was an 11–1 win against the Philippines in 1967, a winning margin of 10 goals. The team's longest winning streak is eight matches, while their longest unbeaten run spans 16 consecutive matches.

The following is a list of match results in the last 12 months, as well as any future matches that have been scheduled.

Win Draw Loss Fixture

=== 2025 ===
26 November 2025 2025 Arab Cup qualification	Sudan	2–1	Lebanon	Al Rayyan, Qatar
19:00 UTC+3	Haidar 43' (o.g.); Awad 74'	Report	Khamis 30'	Stadium: Al Gharafa Stadium; Attendance: 20,816; Referee: Abdulrahman Al-Jassim (Qatar)

=== 2026 ===
4 June 2026 2027 Asian Cup qualification	Lebanon	0–2	Yemen	Doha, Qatar
19:00 UTC+3		Report; Report (AFC)	Al-Gahwashi 63', 90'	Stadium: Grand Hamad Stadium; Attendance: 2,038; Referee: Clifford Daypuyat (Philippines)
Note: Lebanon were required to play all their home matches at a neutral venue due to the ongoing Israeli invasion of Lebanon.

27 September 2026 Unofficial friendly	Al Sadd (Qatar)	1–2	Lebanon	Al Rayyan, Qatar
18:30 UTC+3	Firmino 15'	Report	Shahin 3'; Chakroun 26'	Stadium: Jassim bin Hamad Stadium; Attendance: 0
Note: The match was played in two 30-minute halves.

1 October 2026 Friendly	Lebanon	6–0	Maldives	Bishkek, Kyrgyzstan
20:00 UTC+6	Chakroun 3', 36', 42'; Maish 52' (o.g.); Kassas 83', 90+2'	Report		Stadium: Dolen Omurzakov Stadium; Referee: Alimardon Baynazarov (Kyrgyzstan)

4 October 2026 Friendly	Kyrgyzstan	3–1	Lebanon	Bishkek, Kyrgyzstan
20:00 UTC+6	Abdurakhmanov 19'; Shukurov 31'; Khamis 64' (o.g.)	Report	Budib 62'	Stadium: Dolen Omurzakov Stadium; Referee: Rafael Shafeev (Russia)

13 November 2026 2026 Basra Tournament	Iraq	0–0	Lebanon	Basra, Iraq
18:00 UTC+3		Report		Stadium: Basra International Stadium; Attendance: 21,762; Referee: Ali Abbas (Kuwait)

17 November 2026 2026 Basra Tournament	Lebanon	0–0	Palestine	Basra, Iraq
16:00 UTC+3		Report		Stadium: Basra International Stadium; Referee: Ahmed Kadhim Gatea (Iraq)

== Coaching staff ==
Madjid Bougherra has been Lebanon's head coach since 2026.

As of 28 October 2026

Position	Name
Head coach	(Algeria) Madjid Bougherra
Team manager	(Lebanon) Rashid Nassar
Assistant coach	(Algeria) Djamel Mesbah (Lebanon) Yacoub Yassine
Goalkeeper coach	(France) Christophe Sortelle
Fitness coach	(France) Aurelien Remoué
Doctor	(Lebanon) Abbas Masri
Physiotherapist	(Lebanon) Abdulrahman Abboud (Algeria) Hadj Belfodil
Performance analyst	(Algeria) Djalil Bouglali
Media officer	(Lebanon) Charbel Krayem
Equipment manager	(Lebanon) Chafik Fares

== Players ==
=== Current squad ===
The following players were called up for the 2026 Basra International Tournament matches against Iraq and Palestine on 13 and 17 November 2026, respectively.

Information correct as of 17 November 2026, after the match against Palestine.

No.	Pos.	Player	Date of birth (age)	Caps	Goals	Club
1	GK	Antoine Al Douaihy	18 March 1999 (age 27)	1	0	(Lebanese Football Association) Safa
21	GK	Mostafa Matar (captain)	10 September 1995 (age 31)	47	0	(Lebanese Football Association) Nejmeh
23	GK	Ali Sabeh	24 June 1994 (age 32)	9	0	(Lebanese Football Association) Jwaya
2	DF	Mohammad El Hayek	19 February 2000 (age 26)	19	0	(Lebanese Football Association) Nejmeh
3	DF	Jad Smaira	9 November 2003 (age 23)	5	0	(Cyprus Football Association) Karmiotissa
4	DF	Hassan Kaafarani	17 December 2001 (age 24)	4	0	(Lebanese Football Association) Jwaya
5	DF	Khalil Khamis	12 January 1995 (age 31)	25	2	(Lebanese Football Association) Nejmeh
12	DF	Ali Alrida Ismail	8 July 2003 (age 23)	3	0	(Lebanese Football Association) Nejmeh
15	DF	João Gabriel Maklouf	4 June 2007 (age 19)	4	0	(Italian Football Federation) Como U20
18	DF	Hasan Farhat	21 September 2004 (age 22)	5	0	(Lebanese Football Association) Jwaya
19	DF	Bader Kawam	2 April 2006 (age 20)	3	0	(Lebanese Football Association) Jwaya
6	MF	Mahmoud Zbib	29 February 2004 (age 22)	3	0	(Lebanese Football Association) Ahed
13	MF	Ahmad Kheir El Dine	7 July 1995 (age 31)	17	0	(Lebanese Football Association) Ansar
14	MF	Wehbi Fawaz	5 May 2006 (age 20)	4	0	(Lebanese Football Association) Jwaya
16	MF	Hussein Monzer	20 March 1997 (age 29)	14	0	(Lebanese Football Association) Jwaya
22	MF	Ali El Fadl	29 March 2003 (age 23)	3	0	(Lebanese Football Association) Nejmeh
7	FW	Reda Khadra	4 July 2001 (age 25)	2	0	(Association of Football Federations of Azerbaijan) Qarabağ
10	FW	Husseyn Chakroun	10 November 2004 (age 22)	10	5	(German Football Association) Hannover 96
11	FW	Ali Kassas	25 May 2003 (age 23)	14	3	(Lebanese Football Association) Nejmeh
17	FW	Khalil Bader	27 July 1999 (age 27)	16	2	(Lebanese Football Association) Ansar
20	FW	Samy Merheg	6 December 2006 (age 19)	15	7	(Portuguese Football Federation) Alverca

=== Recent call-ups ===
The following players have been called up to the national team in the past 12 months but are not part of the current squad.

Pos.	Player	Date of birth (age)	Caps	Goals	Club	Latest call-up
GK	Joey Batrouni	13 September 2002 (age 24)	0	0	(United States) San Antonio FC	v. Iraq; 13 November 2026 ^{PRE}
GK	Mehdi Khalil	19 September 1991 (age 35)	58	0	(Lebanon) Sagesse	v. Yemen; 4 June 2026
DF	Pedro Budib	7 April 2004 (age 22)	4	2	(Mexico) Pachuca	v. Iraq; 13 November 2026 ^{INJ}
DF	Kassem El Zein	2 December 1990 (age 35)	56	2	(Lebanon) Nejmeh	v. Yemen; 4 June 2026 ^{RET}
DF	Hussein Zein	27 January 1995 (age 31)	49	0	(Lebanon) Nejmeh	v. Yemen; 4 June 2026
DF	Nassar Nassar	1 January 1992 (age 34)	34	0	(Lebanon) Ansar	v. Yemen; 4 June 2026
DF	Hussein Sharafeddine	13 October 1997 (age 29)	5	0	(Lebanon) Jwaya	v. Yemen; 4 June 2026
DF	Mohamad Safwan	10 March 2003 (age 23)	12	1	(Lebanon) Jwaya	v. Sudan; 26 November 2025
MF	Walid Shour	10 June 1996 (age 30)	41	1	(Lebanon) Jwaya	v. Kyrgyzstan; 4 October 2026
MF	Hasan Srour	18 December 2001 (age 24)	23	0	(Lebanon) Jwaya	v. Kyrgyzstan; 4 October 2026
MF	Mohamad Haidar	8 November 1989 (age 37)	110	6	(Lebanon) Nejmeh	v. Yemen; 4 June 2026 ^{RET}
MF	Ali Tneich	16 July 1992 (age 34)	31	1	(Lebanon) Ansar	v. Yemen; 4 June 2026
MF	Jihad Ayoub	30 March 1995 (age 31)	26	2	(Lebanon) Jwaya	v. Yemen; 4 June 2026
MF	Gabriel Bitar	23 August 1998 (age 28)	16	0	(Canada) Inter Toronto	v. Yemen; 4 June 2026
MF	Mahdi Zein	23 May 2000 (age 26)	15	1	(Lebanon) Ansar	v. Yemen; 4 June 2026
MF	Khoder Kaddour	6 September 2003 (age 23)	5	0	(Australia) Sydney Olympic	v. Sudan; 26 November 2025
FW	Leonardo Shahin	10 August 2003 (age 23)	8	0	(Sweden) IK Oddevold	v. Palestine; 17 November 2026 ^{INJ}
FW	Jimmy Kazan	26 March 2007 (age 19)	3	0	(Lebanon) Jwaya	v. Palestine; 17 November 2026 ^{INJ}
FW	Ralph Khoury	9 May 2007 (age 19)	2	0	(Canada) Atlético Ottawa	v. Kyrgyzstan; 4 October 2026
FW	Karim Darwich	2 November 1998 (age 28)	34	3	(Oman) Al-Nahda	v. Yemen; 4 June 2026
FW	Omar Chaaban	3 January 1994 (age 32)	25	2	(China) Suzhou Dongwu	v. Yemen; 4 June 2026
FW	Ali Al Haj	2 February 2001 (age 25)	15	1	(Lebanon) Nejmeh	v. Yemen; 4 June 2026
FW	Zein Farran	21 July 1999 (age 27)	12	1	(Lebanon) Jwaya	v. Yemen; 4 June 2026
FW	Austin Ayoubi	27 July 2001 (age 25)	1	0	(Australia) West Torrens Birkalla	v. Yemen; 4 June 2026
FW	Malek Fakhro	14 December 1997 (age 28)	12	5	(Germany) 1. FC Bocholt	v. Sudan; 26 November 2025
FW	Hussein Ezeddine	17 October 2002 (age 24)	2	0	(Lebanon) Ahed	v. Sudan; 26 November 2025
Notes: ^{INJ} = Withdrew due to injury; ^{PRE} = Preliminary squad / standby; ^{RET} = Retired from the national team

=== Diaspora recruitment ===
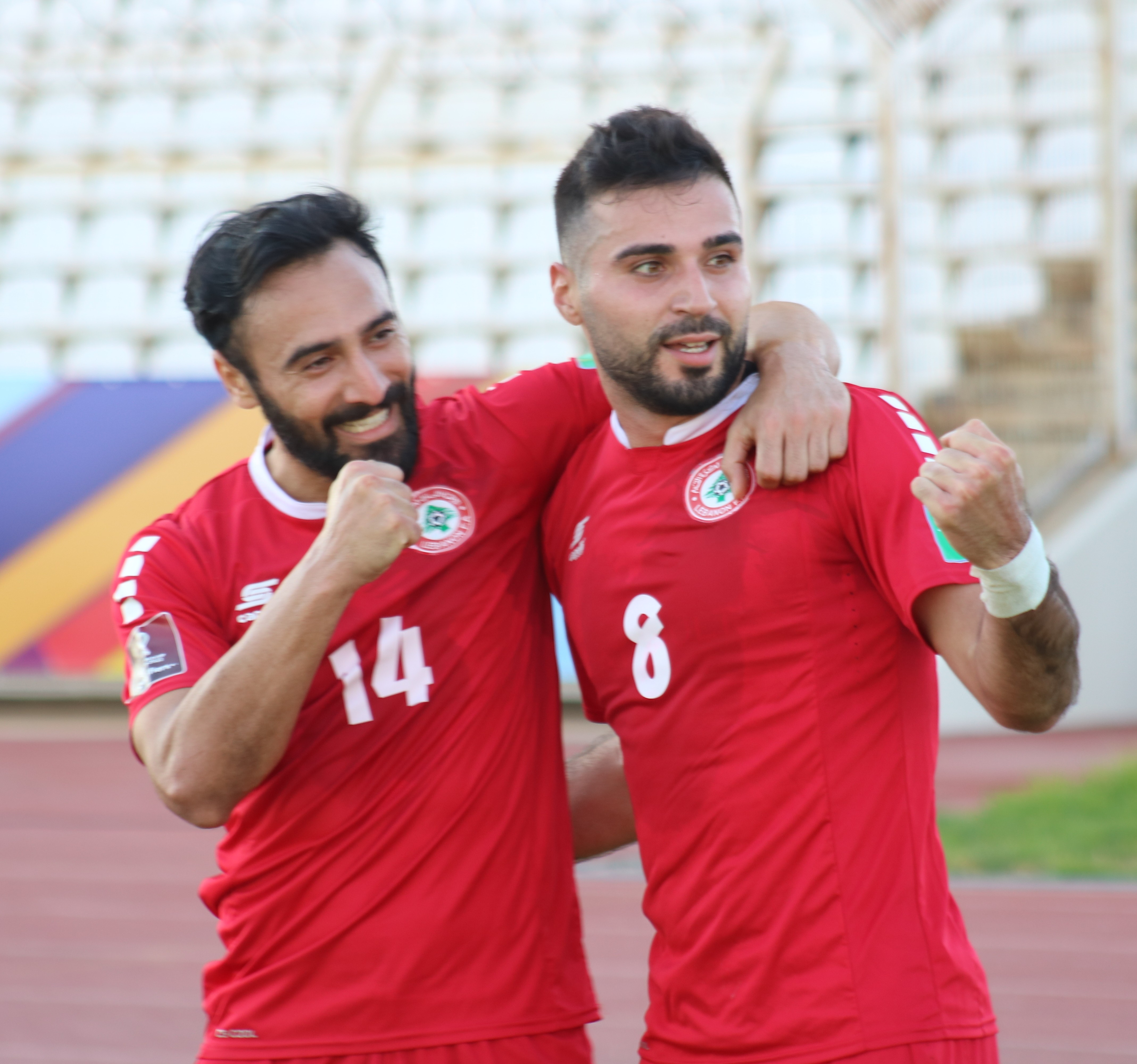
Nader Matar (left) and Soony Saad (right), born in the Ivory Coast and the United States respectively, celebrating a goal for Lebanon in 2021

The LFA has regularly recruited players of Lebanese descent from the Lebanese diaspora to strengthen the national team and bolster its domestic player pool. At the 2000 Asian Cup, Lebanon's squad included five Lebanese-Brazilian players. During the late 2010s and 2020s, recruitment expanded to draw players from Europe, Africa, and the Americas; nine of the 23 players selected for the 2019 Asian Cup were born outside Lebanon, and 12 foreign-born players were included in the 2023 Asian Cup squad.

Integrating overseas-born recruits has also shaped life inside the squad. Because several diaspora players grew up outside Lebanon with limited Arabic, English is frequently used alongside Arabic in the dressing room, and some newcomers initially struggle with the national anthem. While captain Hassan Maatouk welcomed the addition of overseas players to help the team, former captain Abbas Atwi warned that overseas recruits should complement locally developed players rather than block their path into the national team.

Recruitment is facilitated by Lebanon's nationality law, which permits dual citizenship and grants nationality through paternal descent, extending to a paternal grandfather. However, under the 1925 nationality decree, Lebanese women cannot pass citizenship to their children on the same terms as men. Because FIFA rules require players to hold the nationality of the association they represent, The Asian Game reported in 2026 that this restriction has prevented more than 20 players of Lebanese descent from representing the national team. Even among eligible players, slow government processing of citizenship paperwork has at times prevented the LFA from registering recruits with FIFA in time for major tournaments, including the 2023 Asian Cup.

== Individual records ==
As of 17 November 2026
Players in bold are still active with Lebanon.

=== Most-capped players ===
Hassan Maatouk is Lebanon's all-time record goalscorer and most-capped player.

Rank	Player	Caps	Goals	Period
1	Hassan Maatouk	123	26	2006–2024
2	Mohamad Haidar	110	6	2011–2026
3	Abbas Ahmad Atwi	89	8	2002–2016
4	Roda Antar	83	20	1998–2016
5	Youssef Mohamad	81	3	1999–2016
6	Nader Matar	71	4	2012–2024
6	Jamal Taha	71	12	1993–2000
8	Walid Ismail	69	1	2010–2019
9	Nour Mansour	67	3	2010–2024
10	Vardan Ghazaryan	66	21	1995–2001

=== Top scorers ===
Vardan Ghazaryan was Lebanon's top scorer, before being surpassed by Hassan Maatouk in 2023.

Rank	Player	Goals	Caps	Average	Period
1	Hassan Maatouk (list)	26	123	0.21	2006–2024
2	Vardan Ghazaryan	21	66	0.32	1995–2001
3	Roda Antar	20	83	0.24	1998–2016
4	Mohamad Ghaddar	19	46	0.41	2006–2017
5	Levon Altounian	17	18	0.94	1956–1967
6	Haitham Zein	16	50	0.32	1997–2004
7	Mahmoud El Ali	12	46	0.26	2007–2012
7	Jamal Taha	12	71	0.17	1993–2000
9	Joseph Abou Mrad	11	24	0.46	1953–1967
10	Mardik Tchaparian	10	11	0.91	1956–1963

== Competitive record ==
Competition	1st place, gold medalist(s)	2nd place, silver medalist(s)	3rd place, bronze medalist(s)	Total
FIFA World Cup	0	0	0	0
AFC Asian Cup	0	0	0	0
FIFA Arab Cup	0	0	2	2
WAFF Championship	0	0	0	0
Olympic Games	0	0	0	0
Asian Games	0	0	0	0
Arab Games	0	0	2	2
Mediterranean Games	0	0	1	1
Total	0	0	5	5

=== FIFA World Cup ===
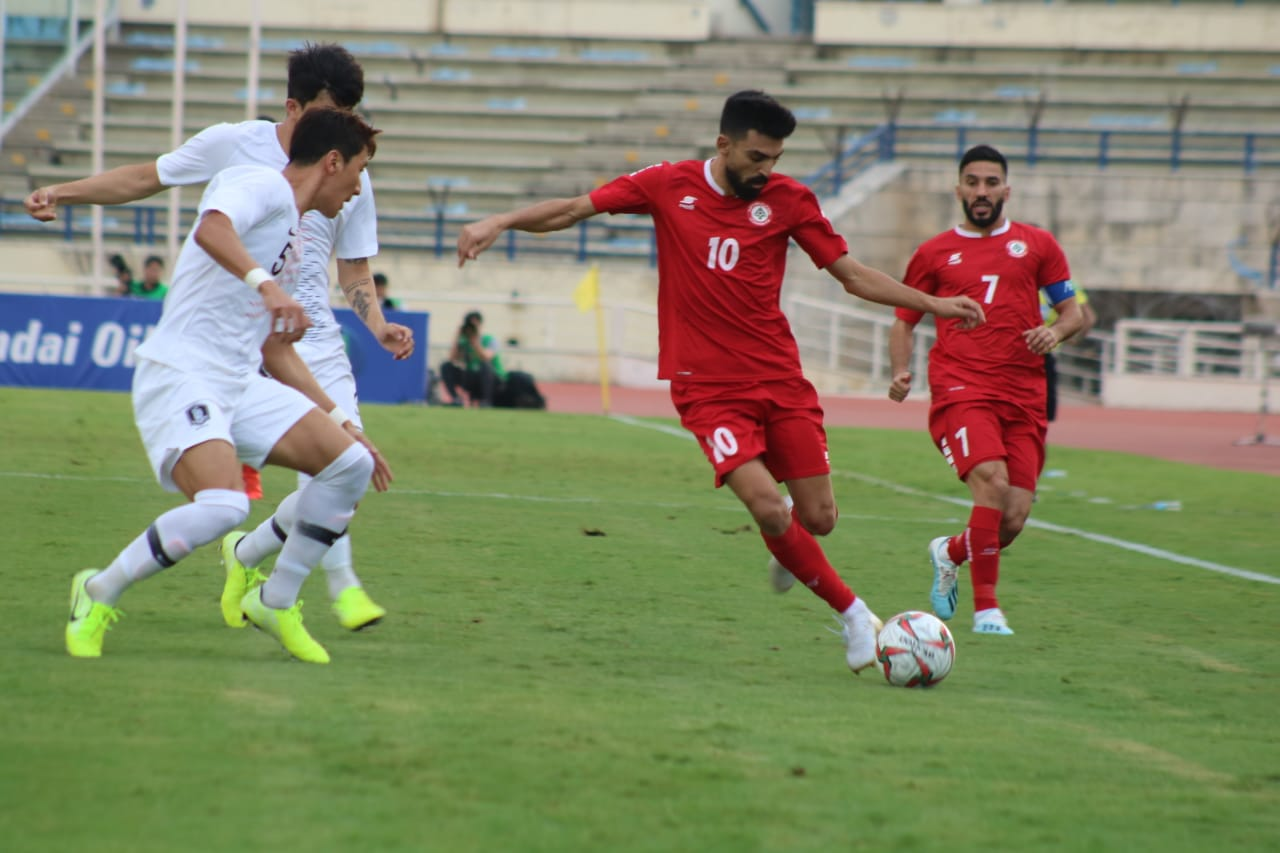
Lebanon's match against South Korea at the 2022 World Cup qualifiers

Although the Lebanese Football Association was formed in 1933, Lebanon's first qualification campaign for the FIFA World Cup took place in the 1986 edition. However, after playing four matches, Lebanon withdrew due to the ongoing civil war, and their results were subsequently annulled. The country's first full qualification campaign came two editions later, in 1994, where they finished third in their group with two wins, four draws, and two losses. Ever since, Lebanon have participated in every iteration of the World Cup qualifiers.

Lebanon first reached the final round of World Cup qualification during the 2014 campaign. After beating Bangladesh 4–2 on aggregate in the second round, Lebanon qualified for the third round, where they were drawn with South Korea, Kuwait, and the United Arab Emirates. The team beat South Korea in a notable 2–1 win at home, coming second in their group and qualifying for the fourth (and final) round for the first time. Grouped with Iran, South Korea, Uzbekistan, and Qatar, Lebanon finished last in Group A and were eliminated with only one win and two draws in eight games.

Champions Runners-up Third place

FIFA World Cup record										Qualification record							
Year	Host	Position	Pld	W	D	L	GF	GA	Squad	Pos.	Pld	W	D	L	GF	GA	Ref.
1930 to 1934		Not a FIFA member								Not a FIFA member							—
1938 to 1982		Did not enter								Did not enter							—
1986	Mexico	Withdrew								Withdrew							
1990	Italy	Did not enter								Did not enter							—
1994	United States	Did not qualify								3rd of 5	8	2	4	2	8	9	
1998	France	Did not qualify								2nd of 3	4	1	1	2	4	7	
2002	South Korea; Japan	Did not qualify								2nd of 4	6	4	1	1	26	5	
2006	Germany	Did not qualify								2nd of 4	6	3	2	1	11	5	
2010	South Africa	Did not qualify								First round win, 4th of 4	8	1	1	6	9	17	
2014	Brazil	Did not qualify								Second round win, 2nd of 4, 5th of 5	16	5	3	8	17	28	
2018	Russia	Did not qualify								2nd of 5	8	3	2	3	12	6	
2022	Qatar	Did not qualify								2nd of 5, 6th of 6	16	4	4	8	16	21	
2026	Canada; Mexico; United States	Did not qualify								3rd of 4	6	1	3	2	5	8	
2030	Morocco; Portugal; Spain	To be determined								To be determined							
2034	Saudi Arabia	To be determined								To be determined							
Total		N/A	0	0	0	0	0	0	—	0/21	78	24	21	33	108	106	—

=== AFC Asian Cup ===
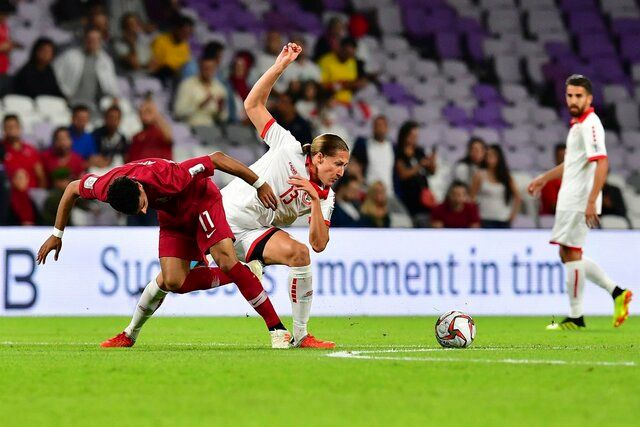
Lebanon's match against Qatar at the 2019 Asian Cup

Lebanon's first qualification campaign for the AFC Asian Cup came at the 1972 edition; drawn in Group B of the Western Zone, Lebanon came second thanks to a 3–2 victory over neighbours Syria and advanced to the next stage. In the decisive semi-final match against Iraq, Lebanon lost 4–1 and were knocked out. Lebanon won a consolatory third-place match against Jordan.

The 2000 edition was Lebanon's first participation in the finals, when the country hosted the event. Following a 4–0 defeat to Iran in the competition's opening match, Lebanon came from behind to draw 2–2 against Iraq; Abbas Chahrour became Lebanon's first goalscorer in the competition. Lebanon drew once again, 1–1 against Thailand, and were eliminated, finishing last in the group.

After finishing the 2019 third round of qualification unbeaten, Lebanon qualified for the Asian Cup through qualification for the first time in their history. In the finals, Lebanon lost the first group stage match 2–0 to eventual champions Qatar, before losing once again by the same score to Saudi Arabia. In the final match of the group, Lebanon needed a win by four goals or more against North Korea to qualify for the knockout stage. Despite conceding an early free-kick goal, Lebanon went on to win the match 4–1 thanks to a brace by Hilal El-Helwe. However, they lost out to Vietnam in the third-place ranking due to having received more yellow cards, and were knocked out of the competition.

Champions Runners-up Third place

AFC Asian Cup record										Qualification record							
Year	Host	Position	Pld	W	D	L	GF	GA	Squad	Pos.	Pld	W	D	L	GF	GA	Ref.
1956 to 1968		Did not enter								Did not enter							—
1972	Thailand	Did not qualify								2nd of 3, semi-final loss	5	2	0	3	6	10	
1976	Iran	Withdrew								Withdrew							
1980	Kuwait	Did not qualify								3rd of 3	2	0	1	1	0	1	
1984	Singapore	Withdrew								Withdrew							
1988	Qatar	Did not enter								Did not enter							—
1992	Japan	Did not enter								Did not enter							—
1996	United Arab Emirates	Did not qualify								2nd of 3	4	2	1	1	7	6	
2000	Lebanon	Group stage	3	0	2	1	3	7	Squad	Qualified as hosts							
2004	China	Did not qualify								3rd of 4	6	1	1	4	2	8	
2007	Indonesia; Malaysia; Thailand; Vietnam	Withdrew								Withdrew							
2011	Qatar	Did not qualify								Preliminary round win, 4th of 4	8	2	1	5	8	14	
2015	Australia	Did not qualify								3rd of 4	6	2	2	2	12	14	
2019	United Arab Emirates	Group stage	3	1	0	2	4	5	Squad	2nd of 5, 1st of 4	14	8	3	3	26	10	
2023	Qatar	Group stage	3	0	1	2	1	5	Squad	2nd of 5	6	3	1	2	11	8	
2027	Saudi Arabia	Did not qualify								3rd of 4, 2nd of 4	12	5	4	3	19	10	
Total		Group stage	9	1	3	5	8	17	—	3/19	63	25	14	24	91	81	—

=== FIFA Arab Cup ===
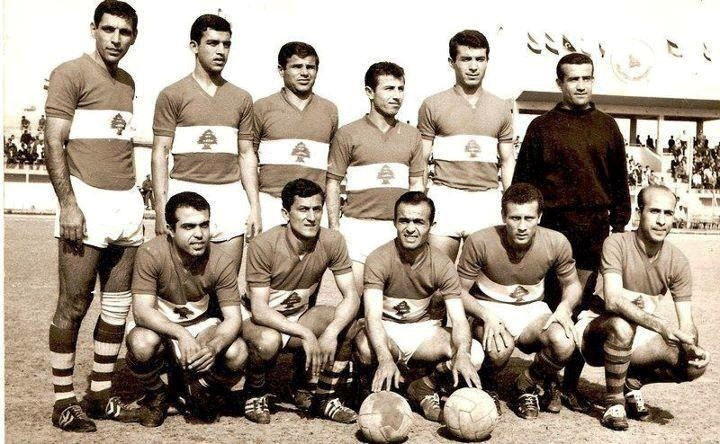
Lebanon's lineup at the 1966 Arab Cup

Lebanon hosted the inaugural edition in 1963, in a group containing Tunisia, Syria, Kuwait, and Jordan. After beating Kuwait 6–0 through a hat-trick by Mardik Tchaparian, Lebanon lost 3–2 to Syria, before winning 5–0 against Jordan. In a decisive match against Tunisia, Muhieddine Itani scored an own goal, and Lebanon lost 1–0, finishing third.

Lebanon finished third in the 1964 edition and fourth in 1966. In subsequent editions, they failed to progress beyond the group stage.

Champions Runners-up Third place

FIFA Arab Cup record										Qualification record							
Year	Host	Position	Pld	W	D	L	GF	GA	Squad	Pos.	Pld	W	D	L	GF	GA	Ref.
1963	Lebanon	Third place	4	2	0	2	13	4	Squad	No qualifying tournament							
1964	Kuwait	Third place	4	1	1	2	4	5	Squad	No qualifying tournament							
1966	Iraq	Fourth place	6	3	1	2	11	10	Squad	No qualifying tournament							
1985	Saudi Arabia	Did not qualify								Withdrew							—
1988	Jordan	Group stage	4	1	2	1	2	4	Squad	2nd of 3	2	0	1	1	1	2	
1992	Syria	Did not enter								No qualifying tournament							—
1998	Qatar	Group stage	2	0	1	1	1	4	Squad	3rd of 4	3	1	0	2	3	4	
2002	Kuwait	Group stage	4	1	1	2	5	7	Squad	No qualifying tournament							
2009	Cancelled									2nd of 4	3	1	2	0	4	0	
2012	Saudi Arabia	Group stage	3	0	1	2	1	4	Squad	No qualifying tournament							
2021	Qatar	Group stage	3	1	0	2	1	3	Squad	Win	1	1	0	0	1	0	
2025	Qatar	Did not qualify								Loss	1	0	0	1	1	2	
2029	Qatar	To be determined								To be determined							
2033	Qatar	To be determined								To be determined							
Total		Third place	30	9	7	14	38	41	—	8/11	10	3	3	4	10	8	—

=== WAFF Championship ===
Bar the 2008 and 2010 editions, Lebanon have participated in every WAFF Championship; they have failed to qualify past the group stage on all occasions. Their first participation in the WAFF Championship was in 2000, at the inaugural edition. Drawn with Iraq, hosts Jordan, and Kyrgyzstan, Lebanon finished third in their group with one win, one draw, and one loss.

Champions Runners-up Third place

WAFF Championship record										Qualification record							
Year	Host	Position	Pld	W	D	L	GF	GA	Squad	Pos.	Pld	W	D	L	GF	GA	Ref.
2000	Jordan	Group stage	3	1	1	1	3	2	Squad	No qualifying tournament							
2002	Syria	Group stage	2	0	0	2	0	3	Squad	No qualifying tournament							
2004	Iran	Group stage	2	0	0	2	1	7	Squad	No qualifying tournament							
2007	Jordan	Group stage	2	0	0	2	0	4	Squad	No qualifying tournament							
2008	Iran	Did not enter								No qualifying tournament							—
2010	Jordan	Did not enter								No qualifying tournament							—
2012	Kuwait	Group stage	3	1	0	2	2	3	Squad	No qualifying tournament							
2013	Qatar	Group stage	2	0	1	1	0	2	Squad	No qualifying tournament							
2019	Iraq	Group stage	4	1	1	2	3	4	Squad	No qualifying tournament							
2026	Oman	To be determined								No qualifying tournament							
Total		Group stage	18	3	3	12	9	25	—	7/9	—	—	—	—	—	—	—

=== Olympic Games ===
Lebanon's senior team have never qualified for the Olympic Games final tournament; their first qualification campaign was for Rome 1960. After losing the first two group stage games against Iraq, Lebanon withdrew and the two remaining matches were awarded to their opponent Turkey. Lebanon participated in two more qualifications, 1968 Mexico City and 1972 Munich, failing to qualify for the final tournament on both occasions. Starting from the 1992 edition, the Olympic Football Tournament has been reserved for national under-23 teams.

Gold Silver Bronze

Olympic Games record										Qualification record							
Year	Host	Position	Pld	W	D	L	GF	GA	Squad	Pos.	Pld	W	D	L	GF	GA	Ref.
1900	Paris	Did not enter								Did not enter							—
1904	St. Louis	Did not enter								Did not enter							—
1908	London	Did not enter								Did not enter							—
1912	Stockholm	Did not enter								Did not enter							—
1920	Antwerp	Did not enter								Did not enter							—
1924	Paris	Did not enter								Did not enter							—
1928	Amsterdam	Did not enter								Did not enter							—
1936	Berlin	Did not enter								Did not enter							—
1948	London	Did not enter								Did not enter							—
1952	Helsinki	Did not enter								Did not enter							—
1956	Melbourne	Did not enter								Did not enter							—
1960	Rome	Withdrew								3rd of 3	4	0	0	4	0	15	
1964	Tokyo	Withdrew								Withdrew							
1968	Mexico City	Did not qualify								3rd of 6	5	2	1	2	18	9	
1972	Munich	Did not qualify								First round loss	3	1	0	2	2	3	
1976	Montreal	Withdrew								Withdrew							
1980	Moscow	Did not enter								Did not enter							—
1984	Los Angeles	Withdrew								Withdrew							
1988	Seoul	Did not enter								Did not enter							—
1992–present	See Lebanon national under-23 football team									See Lebanon national under-23 football team							
Total		N/A	—	—	—	—	—	—	—	0/19	12	3	1	8	20	27	—

=== Asian Games ===
The Lebanon national senior team only participated once at the Asian Games, at Bangkok 1998. Thanks to a 5–1 win against Cambodia, Lebanon qualified past the preliminary round and were drawn with Qatar, Thailand, and Kazakhstan in the second round. Following two 1–0 defeats, respectively to Qatar and Thailand, Lebanon won 3–0 against Kazakhstan in their final encounter of the group stage. However, the three points were not enough to qualify Lebanon for the knockout round.

Gold Silver Bronze

Asian Games record										Qualification record							
Year	Host	Position	Pld	W	D	L	GF	GA	Squad	Pos.	Pld	W	D	L	GF	GA	Ref.
1951	New Delhi	Did not enter								No qualifying tournament							—
1954	Manila	Did not enter								No qualifying tournament							—
1958	Tokyo	Did not enter								No qualifying tournament							—
1962	Jakarta	Did not enter								No qualifying tournament							—
1966	Bangkok	Did not enter								No qualifying tournament							—
1970	Bangkok	Did not enter								No qualifying tournament							—
1974	Tehran	Did not enter								No qualifying tournament							—
1978	Bangkok	Did not enter								No qualifying tournament							—
1982	New Delhi	Did not enter								No qualifying tournament							—
1986	Seoul	Did not enter								No qualifying tournament							—
1990	Beijing	Did not enter								No qualifying tournament							—
1994	Hiroshima	Did not enter								No qualifying tournament							—
1998	Bangkok	Group stage	5	2	0	3	9	7	Squad	No qualifying tournament							
2002–present	See Lebanon national under-23 football team									See Lebanon national under-23 football team							—
Total		Group stage	5	2	0	3	9	7	—	1/13	—	—	—	—	—	—	—

=== Arab Games ===
After participating in the inaugural edition of the Arab Games, at Alexandria 1953, Lebanon hosted the 1957 edition. Topping a group containing Syria, Saudi Arabia, and Jordan, Lebanon reached the semi-finals where they lost 4–2 to Tunisia. Due to Morocco withdrawing from the third-place match, Lebanon finished the tournament in third place. Lebanon also came third in 1997, once again as hosts. With two draws and a win, Lebanon came second in their group and qualified for the semi-finals, which they lost after extra time to Syria. Lebanon finished in third place after beating Kuwait 3–1.

Gold Silver Bronze

Arab Games record										Qualification record							
Year	Host	Position	Pld	W	D	L	GF	GA	Squad	Pos.	Pld	W	D	L	GF	GA	Ref.
1953	Alexandria	Fifth place	3	1	1	1	10	5	Squad	No qualifying tournament							
1957	Beirut	Third place	5	2	2	1	10	6	Squad	No qualifying tournament							
1961	Casablanca	Fourth place	5	2	0	3	13	9	Squad	No qualifying tournament							
1965	Cairo	Group stage	4	1	1	2	4	7	Squad	No qualifying tournament							
1976	Damascus	Did not enter								No qualifying tournament							—
1985	Rabat	Did not enter								No qualifying tournament							—
1992	Aleppo	Did not enter								No qualifying tournament							—
1997	Beirut	Third place	5	2	2	1	9	7	Squad	No qualifying tournament							
1999	Amman	Second stage	5	2	1	2	6	9	Squad	No qualifying tournament							
2007	Cairo	Did not enter								No qualifying tournament							—
2011	Doha	Did not enter								No qualifying tournament							—
2023–present	See Lebanon national under-23 football team									See Lebanon national under-23 football team							—
Total		Third place	27	10	7	10	52	43	—	6/11	—	—	—	—	—	—	—

=== Mediterranean Games ===
Lebanon's first participation at the Mediterranean Games was in 1959, when they hosted the event. They lost both legs against Italy and Turkey, finishing last with no points. Lebanon's senior team participated two more times, in 1963 and 1987, failing to qualify past the group stage on both occasions.

Gold Silver Bronze

Mediterranean Games record										Qualification record							
Year	Host	Position	Pld	W	D	L	GF	GA	Squad	Pos.	Pld	W	D	L	GF	GA	Ref.
1951	Alexandria	Did not enter								No qualifying tournament							—
1955	Barcelona	Did not enter								No qualifying tournament							—
1959	Beirut	Third place	4	0	0	4	1	12	Squad	No qualifying tournament							
1963	Naples	Group stage	4	1	0	3	2	7	Squad	No qualifying tournament							
1967	Tunis	Did not enter								No qualifying tournament							—
1971	İzmir	Did not enter								No qualifying tournament							—
1975	Algiers	Did not enter								No qualifying tournament							—
1979	Split	Did not enter								No qualifying tournament							—
1983	Casablanca	Did not enter								No qualifying tournament							—
1987	Latakia	Group stage	3	0	1	2	1	7	Squad	No qualifying tournament							
1991–1997	See Lebanon national under-23 football team									See Lebanon national under-23 football team							—
Total		Third place	11	1	1	9	4	26	—	3/10	—	—	—	—	—	—	—

=== Other tournaments ===
Lebanon won their first tournament—albeit unofficial—at the 1964 Tripoli Fair Tournament; with three wins and one draw, Lebanon finished first in a group containing Libya, Morocco, Sudan, and Malta. In 1998, Lebanon participated at the Friendship Tournament in the United Arab Emirates where, with two draws and a defeat, they finished in third place out of four. Lebanon also finished in third place at the 2009 King's Cup in Thailand; after losing to the hosts in the semi-finals, they won against North Korea in the third-place match. Between 2023 and 2024, Lebanon participated in several friendly tournaments, finishing runners-up in the 2023 Intercontinental Cup and the 2024 Merdeka Tournament, and in third place in the 2023 King's Cup.

Champions Runners-up Third place

Tournament	Host	Position	Ref.
1964 Tripoli Fair Tournament	Libya	Champions	
1970 Al-Jalaa Tournament	Libya	Group stage	
1974 Kuneitra Cup	Syria	Group stage	
1975 President's Cup	South Korea	Group stage	
1978 President's Cup	South Korea	Group stage	
1989 Peace and Friendship Cup	Kuwait	Group stage	
1998 Friendship Tournament	United Arab Emirates	Third place	
2009 King's Cup	Thailand	Third place	
2009 Nehru Cup	India	Group stage	
2023 Intercontinental Cup	India	Runners-up	
2023 SAFF Championship	India	Semi-finals	
2023 King's Cup	Thailand	Third place	
2024 Merdeka Tournament	Malaysia	Runners-up	
2026 Basra Tournament	Iraq	Third place	

== Honours ==
- Arab Cup
  - (bronze) Third place (2): 1963, 1964
- Arab Games
  - (bronze) Bronze medal (2): 1957, 1997
- Mediterranean Games
  - (bronze) Bronze medal (1): 1959
