= Khiara =

Khiara الخياره
- Village
- Location in Lebanon
- Coordinates: 33°41′20″N 35°50′53″E
- Country: Lebanon
- Governorate: Beqaa Governorate
- District: Western Beqaa District
- Elevation: 2,850 ft (870 m)
- Time zone: UTC+2 (EET)
  - Summer (DST): +3

Khiara (Arabic: الخياره, romanized: al-Khiyārah) is a local authority located in the Western Beqaa District of the Beqaa Governorate in Lebanon.

== History ==
In 1838, Eli Smith noted el-Khiyarah's population as being Sunni Muslim.

== Bibliography ==
- Robinson, E.; Smith, E. (1841). Biblical Researches in Palestine, Mount Sinai and Arabia Petraea: A Journal of Travels in the year 1838. Vol. 3. Boston: Crocker & Brewster.
