= Giancarlo Bercellino =

Italian footballer (born 1941)

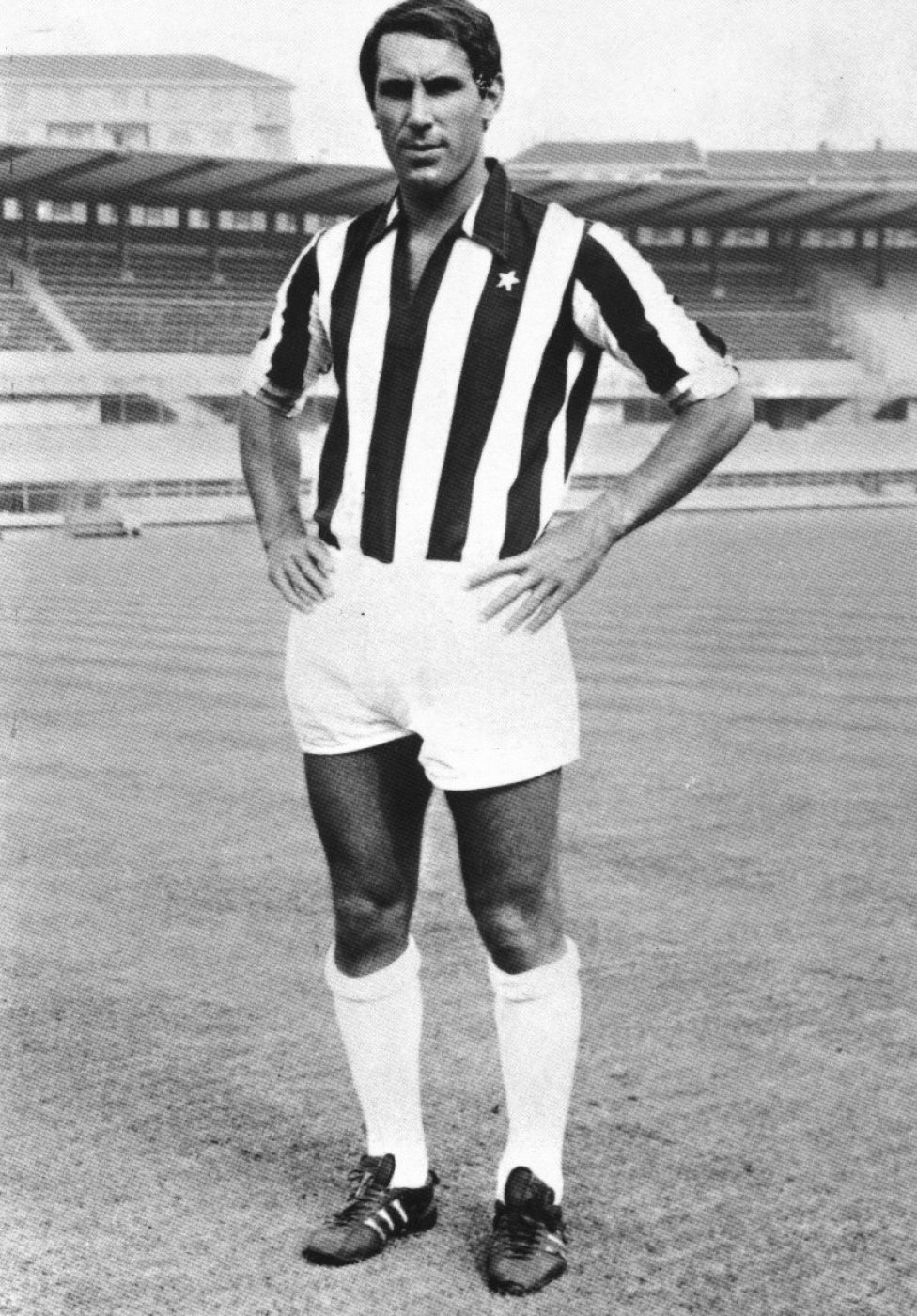
- Bercellino with Juventus in the 1960s

Personal information
- Full name: Giancarlo Bercellino
- Date of birth: 9 October 1941 (age 85)
- Place of birth: Gattinara, Italy
- Height: 1.83 m (6 ft 0 in)
- Position: Defender

Senior career*
Years	Team	Apps	(Gls)
1960–1961	Alessandria	36	(2)
1961–1969	Juventus	154	(10)
1969–1970	Brescia	22	(0)
1970	Lazio		

International career
1965–1968	Italy	6	(0)
Medal record
Men's football
Representing Italy (as player)
UEFA European Championship
Winner	1968 Italy
- * Club domestic league appearances and goals

Giancarlo Bercellino (Italian pronunciation: [dʒaŋˈkarlo bertʃelˈliːno]; born 9 October 1941) is a former Italian footballer who played as a defender. He is sometimes referred to as Bercellino I, because his brother Silvino Bercellino was also a football player. His father Teresio Bercellino also played football professionally in the Serie A.

== Club career ==
At club level Bercellino was most famous for his time with Juventus with whom he played over 200 games with in all competitions between 1961 and 1969, scoring 14 goals, and winning a Serie A title and the Coppa Italia. He also played for Alessandria, Brescia and Lazio.

== International career ==
At international level, Barcellino represented Italy on six occasions between 1965 and 1968, and was a member of the team that won UEFA Euro 1968 on home soil.

== Style of play ==
Bercellino began his career as a centre-forward in his youth, who was known for his dynamism, energy, excellent dribbling skills and powerful and accurate striking ability, which also made him an accurate set-piece and penalty taker. He was later deployed as a defender, where he excelled due to his consistency and tenacious style of play, which made him effective in defending one on one situations. In this new role defensive, he stood out for his physical strength, ability in the air, and his anticipation, although he was also known for his technique and goalscoring ability from defence.

== Honours ==
=== Player ===
==== Club ====
Juventus

- Serie A: 1966–67
- Coppa Italia: 1964–65

==== International ====
Italy

- UEFA European Football Championship: 1968
