= Selim Soydan =

Turkish footballer (1941–2016)

Eşref Selim Soydan (14 November 1941) was a Turkish football player who played for rivals Beşiktaş J.K. and Fenerbahçe. He played as a defender.

== Biography ==
Soydan was born on 14 November 1941 in Beşiktaş, Istanbul. He scored 2 goals in 22 matches for Beşiktaş between 1959 and 1961 and scored 22 goals in 170 matches for Fenerbahçe between 1961 and 1971. He won 4 Turkish Championship, 1 President Cup and Balkan Cup with Fenerbahçe. He competed in the men's tournament at the 1960 Summer Olympics.

He married Turkish actress Hülya Koçyiğit on 5 July 1968.
