= Stadio Alberto Pinto =

Municipal stadium in Caserta,Italy

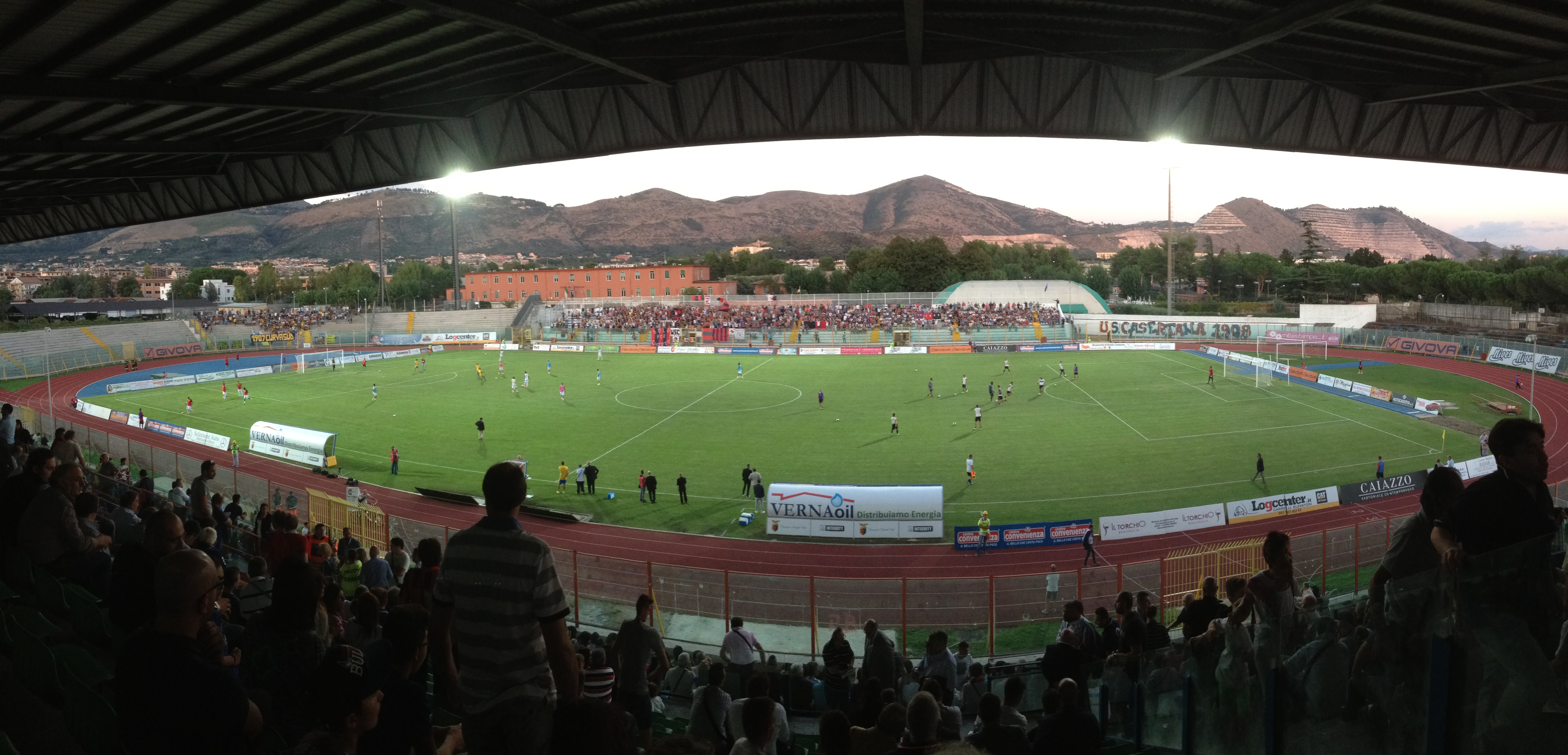
- Interactive map of Stadio Alberto Pinto
- Location: Caserta, Italy
- Coordinates: 41.074517°N 14.346500°E
- Owner: Municipality of Caserta
- Capacity: 12,000 (6,817 in use)
- Surface: Artificial turf
- Field size: 110m × 68m

Construction
- Opened: 1936
- Renovated: 2019

Tenant
- Casertana

The Stadio Alberto Pinto is a municipal stadium in Caserta, Italy, located in the eastern part of the city and home ground of football team Casertana.

Owned by the Municipality of Caserta, it is primarily used for football matches, athletics and pop music concerts.

It has a capacity of 12,000 seats; however, the stadium is currently approved for a capacity of 6,817 seats, arranged in four sectors: central covered and side uncovered grandstand, uncovered front grandstand, and north curve. The south curve was pulled down during the renovation works for the 2019 Summer Universiade. In the autumn of 2020, new artificial turf was installed.
