= Silvino Bercellino =

Italian footballer (born 1946)

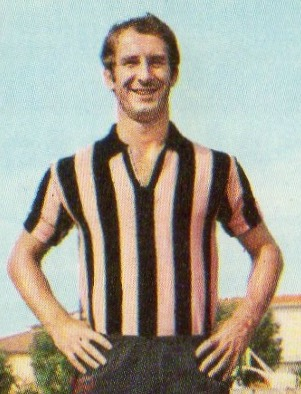
- Bercellino II with Palermo in 1969

Personal information
- Date of birth: 31 January 1946 (age 80)
- Place of birth: Gattinara, Italy
- Height: 1.77 m (5 ft 9 1/2 in)
- Position: Striker

Senior career*
Years	Team	Apps	(Gls)
1963–1964	Juventus	2	(1)
1964–1965	Potenza	34	(18)
1965–1966	Juventus	10	(6)
1966–1967	Palermo	35	(13)
1967	Mantova	5	(1)
1967–1972	Palermo	99	(24)
1972–1973	Monza	17	(1)
1973–1974	Livorno	26	(4)
1974–1978	Biellese	104	(55)
1978–1979	Grignasco		
- * Club domestic league appearances and goals

Silvino Bercellino (Italian pronunciation: [ˈsilvjo bertʃelˈliːno]; born 31 January 1946) is an Italian former professional footballer who played as a striker. He was also referred to as Bercellino II to distinguish him from his brother Giancarlo Bercellino, also a football player. His father Teresio Bercellino also played football professionally.
