= Turkey national amateur football team =

Turkey amateur
- Association: Turkish Football Federation
- Confederation: UEFA (Europe)
- FIFA code: TUR
First colours	Second colours

The Turkey national amateur football team (Turkish: Türkiye amatör millî futbol takımı) was an amateur representative association football team of Turkey organised by the Turkish Football Federation. It represented Turkey in international competitions subject to amateur eligibility requirements, including Olympic football, the Mediterranean Games and the UEFA Amateur Cup.

The team emerged as a distinct national selection following the introduction of professional football in Turkey in the early 1950s.

== History ==
The amateur national team developed following the introduction of professional football in Turkey in 1952. The team participated at the 1952 Summer Olympics in Helsinki.

The amateur national team was distinct from Turkeys senior, B and youth national teams. Players who represented the amateur side could later progress to other levels of the nationalm team system, including the B and senior national teams. Players such as Tuncay Becedek represented the amateur team before becoming both a B and senior international in 1962.

The amateur national team represented Turkey at several editions of the Mediterranean Games. At the 1959 Mediterranean Games in Beirut, Turkey finished second behind Italy to win the silver medal. Turkey again won silver at the 1963 Mediterranean Games in Naples. The team also participated in the 1967 Mediterranean Games in Tunis, where Turkey reached the semi-finals before finishing fourth. Turkey hosted and won bronze the 1971 Mediterranean Games in İzmir.

The team participated in the UEFA Amateur Cup in 1967, 1974 and 1977–78.

The team participated in the 1970 RCD Cup, having been assembled and trained specifically for the RCD Cup a month earlier. While the amateur team competed in the tournament, Turkey's senior and Ümit national teams were separately preparing for matches against West Germany the following month.

In December 1973, Cumhuriyet reported that since the introduction of professionalism in 1952, the amateur national team had played 42 matches, recording 17 wins, 7 draws and 18 defeats.

The spread of professional football and FIFA's decision to allow amateur and professional players to compete in the same tournaments led to the discontinuation of the Turkish amateur national football team's activities in the 1990s. Today, amateur national-level football is maintained through locally formed squads, such as the Istanbul amateur select team and the Ankara regional select team.

== Role and player eligibility ==
The Turkish Football Federation used domestic amateur football to identify players for the national side. Ahead of the 1960 Olympics, for example, the amateur national squad was expanded using players identified during the Turkish Amateur Football Championship.

Maintaining amateur status could also affect players club careers. As the distinction between amateur and professional football became increasingly difficult to maintain, the federation at times restricted selected players from signing professional contracts in order to preserve their eligibility for the amateur national team.

The difficulties created by this system were particularly apparent by the early 1980s. In 1983, the federation announced that restrictions preventing 41 footballers from signing professional contracts, imposed in order to form an amateur national team for the Mediterranean Games and Olympic qualifying competition, had been lifted. Later that year, a controversy developed over players used by the amateur national team whose professional contracts had previously been approved by the federation.

== Honours ==
Mediterranean Games

- Silver (2): 1959, 1963
- Bronze (1): 1971

UEFA Amateur Cup

- Fourth place (1): 1967
