= Nedim Doğan =

Turkish footballer

Nedim Doğan (born 1943 in Istanbul) was a Turkish football player of Fenerbahçe. He played as a forward. He started his professional career with İstanbulspor and then transferred to Fenerbahçe where he played twelve years between 1961-73. He scored 101 goals in 416 matches for Fenerbahçe SK.

He played 9 matches for the national team.
