= Renato Benaglia =

Italian footballer and coach

Personal information
- Date of birth: 24 March 1938
- Place of birth: Valeggio sul Mincio, Italy
- Date of death: 1 February 2023 (aged 84)
- Place of death: Florence, Italy
- Height: 1.74 m (5 ft 9 in)
- Position: Midfielder

Senior career*
Years	Team	Apps	(Gls)
1957–1958	Verona	0	(0)
1958–1959	Alma Juventus Fano	31	(5)
1959–1961	Fiorentina	16	(0)
1961–1963	Catania	64	(4)
1963–1965	Fiorentina	42	(2)
1965–1966	Roma	29	(1)
1966–1968	L.R. Vicenza	0	(0)

Managerial career
- 1972–1973: L'Aquila
- 1975–1976: Grosseto
- * Club domestic league appearances and goals

Renato Benaglia (24 March 1938 – 1 February 2023) was an Italian football player and coach. He played for seven seasons (151 games, 7 goals) in the Serie A for ACF Fiorentina, Calcio Catania and A.S. Roma.

== Honours ==
Fiorentina

- Coppa Italia: 1960–61
