= 1935–36 in Mandatory Palestine football =

Football in Mandatory Palestine
- Season: 1935–36

The 1935–36 season was the ninth season of competitive football in the British Mandate for Palestine under the Eretz Israel Football Association and the 4th under the Arab Palestine Sports Federation.

== IFA Competitions ==
=== 1935–36 Palestine League ===
Only six teams took part in the league. Due to the 1936-1939 Arab revolt, the league matches were suspended starting from 12 March 1936. The final matches of the league schedule were played in December 1936.

Pos	Team	Pld	W	D	L	GF	GA	GR	Pts
1	Hapoel Tel Aviv	8	4	3	1	22	9	2.444	11
2	Maccabi Tel Aviv	7	4	2	1	15	6	2.500	10
3	Hakoah Tel Aviv	7	4	2	1	15	7	2.143	10
4	Hapoel Haifa	8	4	2	2	15	10	1.500	10
5	Maccabi Petah Tikva	8	1	3	4	8	19	0.421	5
6	Maccabi Nes Tziona	8	0	0	8	1	25	0.040	0

Updated to match(es) played on 21 March 1936. Source: EIFA League Tables 1930-1948, pp. 36-39

=== Northern League ===
In January 1936 six teams from the Haifa region organized a league. The league operated between 25 January and 9 March 1936 and was abandoned due to security difficulties. Only ten matches were played.

Pos	Team	Pld	W	D	L	GF	GA	GR	Pts
1	Hapoel Haifa B	5	3	2	0	19	9	2.111	8
2	Hapoel Nesher	4	2	2	0	16	7	2.286	6
3	Maccabi Hadera	3	1	2	0	6	3	2.000	4
4	IPC Workers	3	1	0	2	6	11	0.545	2
5	Hapoel Tiberias	2	0	0	2	2	7	0.286	0
6	Hapoel Afula	3	0	0	3	2	14	0.143	0

Updated to match(es) played on 9 March 1936. Source: EIFA League Tables 1930-1948, pp. 40-41

=== 1936 Palestine Cup ===
The 1936-1939 Arab revolt caused the 1936 Palestine Cup competition, which started on 15 February 1936 to be stopped after only three matches were played.

- Maccabi Avshalom Petah Tikva – Maccabi Shimon Tel Aviv 2–1
- Maccabi Hasmonean Jerusalem – Hapoel HaDarom Tel Aviv 1–1
- Maccabi Avshalom Petah Tikva – Hapoel Haifa 4–2

== Non-EIFA tournaments ==
=== South District Cup ===
This was a makeshift tournament organized in May 1936. The tournament was held over the Shavuot weekend on the Maccabi Ground in Petah Tikva, which was the only usable ground in the Gush Dan area, as other grounds were in threat of Arab actions during the early stages of the Arab revolt. The tournament was due to be played by Maccabi Tel Aviv, Hakoah Tel Aviv, Maccabi Petah Tikva and Hapoel Tel Aviv, but Hapoel Tel Aviv dropped out of the tournament and was replaced by Maccabi Tel Aviv's junior team, Maccabi Shimon. The tournament was played as a single round-robin tournament. Maccabi Tel Aviv won the cup.

Pos	Team	Pld	W	D	L	GF	GA	GR	Pts		MTA	MPT	HKH	SHI
1	Maccabi Tel Aviv	3	2	1	0	7	3	2.333	5	Winners	—			4–1
2	Maccabi Petah Tikva	3	2	0	1	11	7	1.571	4		0–1	—	7–3	4–3
3	Hakoah Tel Aviv	3	0	2	1	7	11	0.636	2		2–2		—	
4	Maccabi Shimon	3	0	1	2	6	10	0.600	1				2–2	—

Updated to match(es) played on 6 June 1936. Source: Ha'Aretz

== Notable events ==
- Romanian club CFR Timișoara visited Palestine in January and played one match against Maccabi Tel Aviv, winning 5–3.
- Hungarian club Bocskai FC visited Palestine in July and played 6 games, winning 4 (3–2 against Maccabi Tel Aviv, 2–1 against Hapoel Haifa, 3–2 against Maccabi Avshalom Petah Tikva and 4–2 against the National team) and drawing 2 (2–2 against Hapoel Tel Aviv and 1–1 against the National team).
