= Natan Panz =

Israeli footballer

Natan Panz נתן פנץ
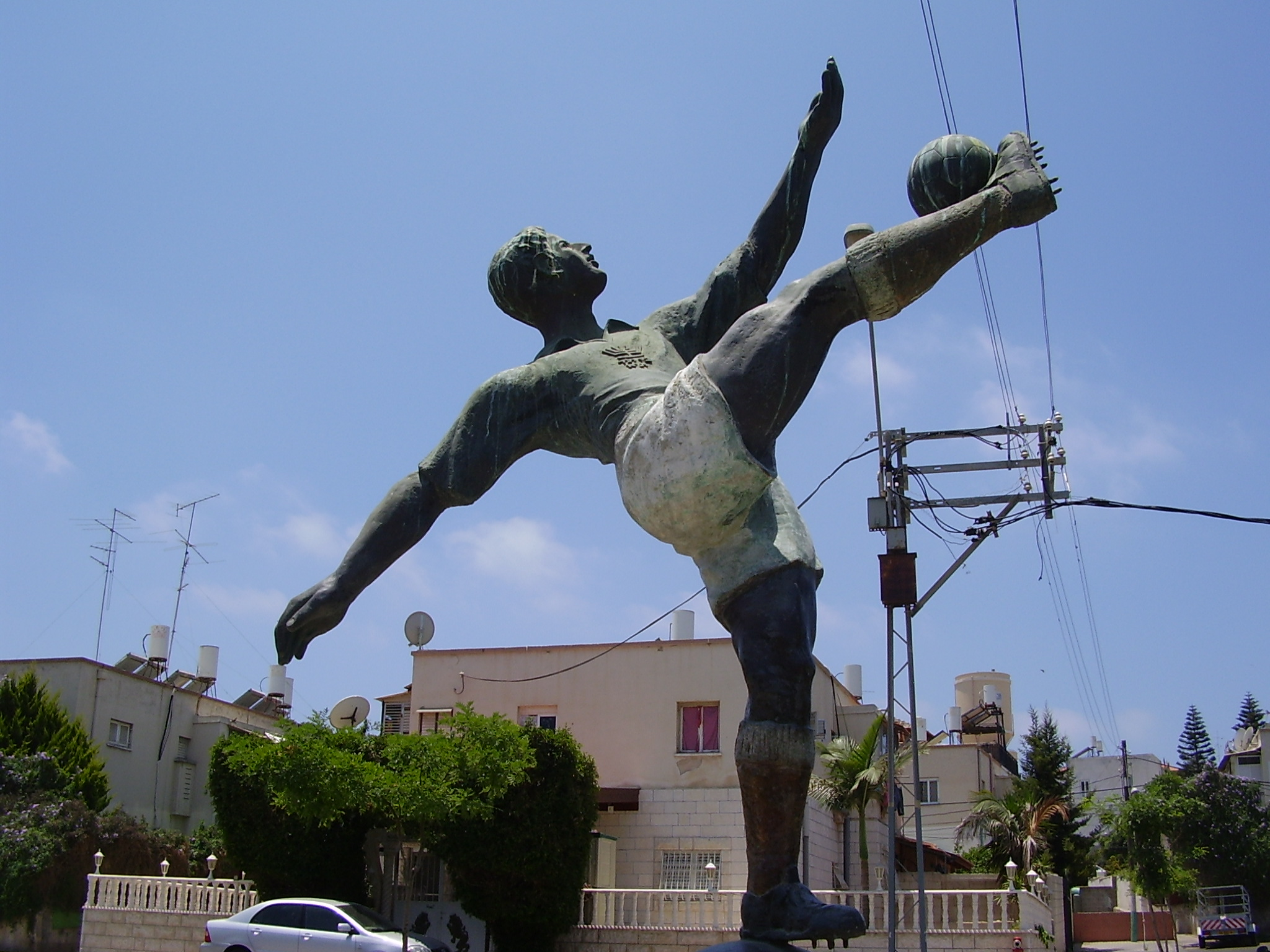

Personal information
- Date of birth: 28 September 1917
- Place of birth: Vitebsk, Russia (present-day Belarus)
- Date of death: 28 April 1948 (aged 30)
- Place of death: Jaffa, Mandatory Palestine

Youth career
- Maccabi Tel Aviv

Senior career*
Years	Team	Apps	(Gls)
1936–1939	Maccabi Tel Aviv		
1939–1948	Beitar Tel Aviv		
1948	Maccabi Tel Aviv		

International career
1938	Mandatory Palestine	1	(0)
- * Club domestic league appearances and goals

Natan Panz (Hebrew: נתן פנץ; 28 September 1917 – 28 April 1948) was a Jewish football player from Mandatory Palestine, who played for Maccabi Tel Aviv, Beitar Tel Aviv, and Mandatory Palestine national football team for only one match. He was also an Irgun member and was killed during the 1947–48 civil war in Mandatory Palestine in battle with the British Army.

== Biography ==
Panz was born in Vitebsk, then in the Russian Republic shortly before the October Revolution. In 1921 the family left Soviet Russia to Eretz Israel and settled in Tel Aviv. Panz studied in Herzliya Hebrew Gymnasium and Nordia Gymnasium before the American University of Beirut. He was employed as a clerk in the Tel Aviv municipality.

== Career ==
Panz started playing football in Maccabi Tel Aviv's youth team and appeared for the senior team at an early age. Panz's performance during Maccabi's tour of North America, landed him an offer to join a New York club, but Panz refused. Panz won two championships, in 1936 and 1937 and made one appearance with the Mandatory Palestine national football team, against Greece, during 1938 FIFA World Cup qualification.

In 1939, Panz transferred to Beitar Tel Aviv and led the club to promotion to the top division. During the following years, the club won two cups (1940 and 1942) and a joint-championship (1945), as well as finishing as runners-up both in the league and the cup. Panz also took part in Beitar's victory over Hajduk Split in 1944.

In 1947, after Beitar Tel Aviv was forced to disband by the Mandatory Government and was reformed as Nordia Tel Aviv, Panz refused to appear in the newly reformed team and transferred back to Maccabi Tel Aviv.

== Death ==
As the 1947–48 civil war in Mandatory Palestine broke out, Panz aided both the Haganah and the Irgun in their defensive activities on the Jaffa frontline, before joining the Irgun, where he was appointed a ranking officer. He participated in a raid on a British munitions train in which arms were seized, helping enable the Irgun to attack Jaffa. On 25 April 1948, the Irgun launched an offensive on Jaffa, which was countered by British forces. Panz was commanding a machine-gun on an armored vehicle in Menashiya and was killed, along with two of his friends, when a British armored vehicle fired on him.

== Honours ==
- league championship (3):
  - With Maccabi Tel Aviv: 1935–36, 1937
  - With Beitar Tel Aviv: 1944–45 (joint-championship)
- Israel State Cup (2):
  - 1940, 1942
