= 1936–37 in Mandatory Palestine football =

Football in Mandatory Palestine
- Season: 1936–37

The 1936–37 season was the tenth season of competitive football in the British Mandate for Palestine under the Eretz Israel Football Association and the 5th under the Arab Palestine Sports Federation.

== IFA Competitions ==
=== 1935–36 Palestine League ===
The second part of the 1935–36 Palestine League was held in autumn 1936, after the league schedule was disturbed by the 1936–1939 Arab revolt. The competition, which began on 7 December 1935, took over a year to be completed, with the final matches being played in December 1936. Once completed, the league was won by Maccabi Tel Aviv.

==== League table ====
Pos	Team	Pld	W	D	L	GF	GA	GR	Pts	
1	Maccabi Tel Aviv	10	7	2	1	21	9	2.333	16	Champions
2	Hakoah Tel Aviv	10	6	3	1	18	8	2.250	15	
3	Hapoel Tel Aviv	10	4	4	2	24	12	2.000	12	
4	Hapoel Haifa	10	4	2	4	16	13	1.231	10	
5	Maccabi Petah Tikva	10	2	3	5	10	20	0.500	7	
6	Maccabi Nes Tziona	10	0	0	10	2	29	0.069	0	

Updated to match(es) played on 19 December 1936. Source: IFA, The Palestine Post

=== 1937 Palestine League ===
League matches started on 29 January 1937, and once again the competition was not over by the end of the season, but was completed on the next season. For the first time, a second division was operated, called Mahlaka Bet and was split to north and south divisions.

=== 1937 Palestine Cup ===
Hapoel HaDarom Tel Aviv upset Maccabi Tel Aviv with a 2–1 victory in the semi-final to set a meeting with its parent club, Hapoel Tel Aviv in the final. The Hapoel HaDarom victory was assisted by a punishment issued to the senior Maccabi Tel Aviv squad for boycotting Maccabi's match against Aris Thessaloniki in April 1937. Due to the punishment, Maccabi had to field its youth team for the match.

9 May 1937

Hapoel Tel Aviv	3–0	Hapoel HaDarom Tel Aviv
? 55'; Bakshi 57' (o.g.); Poliakov 86'	Palestine Post

Maccabiah Stadium

== Maccabi Tel Aviv Tour of North America ==
In October 1936 Maccabi Tel Aviv went on a tour to the North America, via Alexandria, Marseille and Paris. During the tour, which lasted for 97 days, the club played 15 matches. In France:

- Racing Paris – Maccabi Tel Aviv 2–0
- Olympique Lillois – Maccabi Tel Aviv 3–1

In North America:

- New York All-Stars – Maccabi Tel Aviv 0–6
- Philadelphia Passion – Maccabi Tel Aviv 0–1
- Brooklyn League XI – Maccabi Tel Aviv 0–1
- Detroit All-Stars – Maccabi Tel Aviv 2–2
- Toronto All-Stars – Maccabi Tel Aviv 1–1
- Chicago All-Stars – Maccabi Tel Aviv 0–1
- St. Louis All-Stars – Maccabi Tel Aviv 3–2
- Boston Celtics – Maccabi Tel Aviv 3–2
- New Jersey All-Stars – Maccabi Tel Aviv 1–7
- Philadelphia Passion – Maccabi Tel Aviv 2–0
- American Soccer League XI – Maccabi Tel Aviv 4–1
- Maccabi-Hakoah Chicago – Maccabi Tel Aviv 4–2
- Chicago Sparta – Maccabi Tel Aviv 1–1

== Notable events ==
- Romanian club CFR București played one match in January 1937 in Tel Aviv, beating Maccabi Tel Aviv 1–0.
- Austrian club Admira Vienna played three matches in Tel Aviv, scoring three victories, a 3–0 against Maccabi Tel Aviv, a 3–1 Hapoel Tel Aviv and a 7–1 against the national team.
- Greek club Aris Thessaloniki played two matches in Mandatory Palestine, a 2–0 victory against a British military team in Jerusalem and a 0–0 draw against Hapoel Haifa. A third match, against Maccabi Tel Aviv wasn't played as Maccabi's squad boycotted the match in protest against its out management.
- Hapoel Eretz Israel team played in the 1937 Workers' Summer Olympiad, losing 1–7 to Norway and drawing Finland 1–1.
