= Andrey X =

Russian-Israeli journalist and human rights activist (born 1998)

- Андрей Х
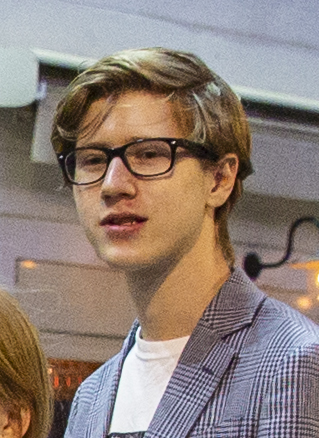
- Andrey X in May 2022
- Born: Andrey Ilyich Khrzhanovskiy; May 2, 1998 (age 28); Saint Petersburg, Russia
- Citizenship: Russia; Israel
- Education: State Russian Museum School; Gordonstoun School; University College London
- Occupations: Journalist; activist
- Years active: 2021–present (journalism); 2023–present (activism)
- Organization: Kompas (2023–2024)
- Father: Ilya Khrzhanovsky
- Relatives: Andrei Khrzhanovsky (grandfather)

Andrey Ilyich Khrzhanovskiy (Note: Russian: Андре́й Ильи́ч Хржано́вский; Hebrew: אנדריי איליץ׳ חרז׳נובסקי.) (born May 2, 1998), known online as Andrey X, is a Russian-Israeli journalist and activist against Israeli settler violence in the West Bank. He has gained prominence during the Gaza war.

The son and grandson, respectively, of filmmakers Ilya and Andrei Khrzhanovsky, Andrey X was born and raised in Saint Petersburg. After traveling to several countries to pursue an education, he went back to Russia, where he worked as a journalist. He left the country upon the outbreak of the Russo-Ukrainian War, settling in Israel and gaining its citizenship. There, he grew sympathetic to the Palestinian cause and began to document settler violence in the occupied West Bank, where he has since resided. Khrzhanovskiy's positioning has been characterized as far-left, and his activism has been met with societal controversy as well as legal issues in Israel.

== Early life and education ==
Andrey Khrzhanovskiy was born in Saint Petersburg to Russian filmmaker Ilya Khrzhanovsky, in turn the son of fellow filmmaker Andrei Khrzhanovsky, and was raised in his birth city. He had a brief experience as a child actor which includes a role in Room and a Half (2009), directed by his grandfather.

Having quit public schooling at the age of 14, he earned his high school degree from the State Russian Museum School at 16 and moved to Scotland, attending Gordonstoun to fulfil the requirements to enter a British university. After spending a year learning about Buddhism and practicing kung fu at the Shaolin Monastery in China, he graduated in Anthropology from University College London with a dissertation focusing on unrecognized states in the post-Soviet area, for which he spent some time in Transnistria. He started his career as a journalist writing for Russian anti-government publications like Meduza, Novaya Gazeta, Doxa and Discours. Until 2022, he also worked in an organization promoting theatre by people on the autism spectrum in Saint Petersburg.

Khrzhanovskiy was visiting his grandparents in Israel in February 2022, when the Russian invasion of Ukraine began; he chose to stay there, fearing potential persecution for his activity as a political journalist. Thanks to his Jewish heritage, he could apply for Israeli citizenship in accordance with the Law of Return; he was granted a passport shortly afterwards, allowing him to settle in Tel Aviv.

== Activism and legal issues ==
Although initially little informed about the Israeli–Palestinian conflict, Khrzhanovskiy said his interactions with Israelis and Palestinians still living inside the Israeli border quickly made him realize he was benefiting from the privileged side of an apartheid system, and he felt compelled to "do something about it." He has mainly attributed this to exchanges with two people: a real estate agent telling him that "Netanya is a very good place to live in because the mayor doesn't allow Arabs to rent apartments;" and the owner of a Jaffa café where he worked having to travel to Jordan in order to visit his family, who was expelled in 1948 and has since been prohibited from entering Israel.

Khrzhanovskiy chose to take action after a firsthand encounter with a settler in the South Hebron Hills, amid the escalating settler and state violence against Palestinians in the occupied West Bank – including military raids – following the outbreak of the Gaza war in October 2023. He joined local human rights organizations engaged in so-called "protective presence" and started documenting the incursions on social media, particularly those in the village of Ras al-Auja and in the Masafer Yatta area, carried out by the Hilltop Youth. He also co-founded the activist and media company Kompas (Компас), providing Russian-language coverage of the West Bank. In the summer of 2024, when he was at the Auja spring, Israeli settlers hit him on the head with a stick, piercing his eardrum.

The following October, Khrzhanovskiy and four other journalists were stopped on their way to Nablus and taken to a military base, where they were reportedly blindfolded, beaten and held for hours in the sun, with authorities charging his colleague Jeremy Loffredo of The Grayzone of "aiding the enemy during wartime" after he had reported on the landing of an Iranian missile on the Nevatim Airbase. Due to Loffredo's association with a pro-Russian outlet, Khrzhanovskiy was expelled from the Kompas collective for failing to adhere to their values, "the main one of which is the rejection of any imperialism, including Russian." He commented that agreeing to accompany Loffredo was "a massive mistake and gross unprofessionalism on [his] part."

On December 12, 2024, Khrzhanovskiy was arrested by the Israeli police in Tel Aviv and taken to a station in Sderot. The stated reason was to arrest him for "vandalism" over a video he had posted two weeks earlier, where he was seen placing a "Free Palestine" sticker on a lookout point in Sderot used by Israelis to watch the bombing of the Gaza Strip, but also dedicated to the memory of an IDF soldier killed in the Be'eri massacre during the October 7 attacks. His actions were publicly criticized by the Ministry of Construction and Housing of Israel, Yitzhak Goldknopf. Khrzhanovskiy was released on conditional bail of ₪15,000, after spending four days in the same prison cell as "Kahanists" and "settlers convicted of homicide". According to him and his lawyers, he was repeatedly beaten and denied any food or water throughout his detention, as well as being refused language support on his trial despite his limited skills in Hebrew; he also denounced last-minute changes to his trial locations, which he claims had the goal of hindering the presence of his defense attorney.

On October 3, 2025, Khrzhanovskiy was part of a group of Israeli protesters who attempted to cross the Israel–Gaza border on foot, in stated solidarity with the Global Sumud Flotilla as an act of pressure to "dismantle the siege on Gaza – by sea and by land." Along with other activists, he was detained and assaulted by Israeli forces, who allegedly sprained his wrist.

In November 2025, Khrzhanovskiy toured Swedish cities, where he spoke about Israeli settler violence. Shortly later, in early December, he was convicted and sentenced to one month and a fine for spray-painting the Embassy of Russia in Tel Aviv two years prior, in protest of the country's war on Ukraine; as of May 2026, the one-month jail sentence is still suspended.

On October 6, 2026, Khrzhanovskiy's car was set on fire during a settler attack between Deir Nidham and Al-Mughayyir, in which threatening graffiti against Avi Bluth and David Zini – the Israeli officials in charge of security in the occupied West Bank – were also sprayed, in "revenge for the [settler] outpost's demolition". On October 21, Khrzhanovskiy was briefly detained by the Israeli police in Taybeh, on reported charges of "demonstrating public identification with a terrorist organization"; a few days earlier, he had filmed footage documenting a settler assault on The Washington Post journalist Heidi Levine in nearby Khirbet Abu Falah.

On October 28, Khrzhanovskiy was physically assaulted by settlers in the village of Umm al-Khair, Masafer Yatta, along with fellow activists Adele Shoko and Jasper Nathaniel; despite reportedly suffering severe head injuries and repeated loss of consciousness, Israeli authorities refused to take him to a hospital or to grant him medical care, and instead took him to a police station. The following day, Shoko reported that he and Nathaniel had been released but forbidden to enter the West Bank, where Khrzhanovskiy lives, for 60 days. In a video posted on November 1, Khrzhanovskiy said he and Nathaniel had been "nearly killed" in the attack, in which he suffered a concussion. He identified some of the attackers as Tomer Liani, Nevo Nadalski and Shimon Atia, and confirmed Shoko's account of the events. He added that while in custody, he and Nathaniel were kept awake and interrogated for several hours during the night. The Committee to Protect Journalists (CPJ) denounced Israeli authorities for detaining the two on unclear legal grounds while "failing to hold those responsible for the violence accountable." After his release, Nathaniel said that they were "charged with assault, along with five other offenses", and also confirmed they had been barred from the West Bank for two months while the attacking settlers had faced no legal repercussions.

In November 2026, Diaspora Minister Amichai Chikli requested that Interior Minister Gideon Sa'ar revoke Khrzhanovskiy's citizenship, citing his social media activity.

=== Views ===
Khrzhanovskiy's political positions have been described as "far-left", with his father calling him "radical left-wing". An anti-Zionist, he contests the legitimacy of the State of Israel and uses the term "1948 territories", supporting a one-state solution to the Israeli–Palestinian conflict. Far-right groups in Israel, including Im Tirtzu and My Israel, have openly criticized him for his "delegitimization campaign against Israel" and have claimed that his denunciation of Israel's genocide in Gaza is close to an antisemitic conspiracy theory, while fellow content creator Shareef Safadi of Haifa has called his work "counter hasbara". Israeli public broadcaster KAN once alleged Khrzhanovskiy may be part of a Russian campaign aimed at destabilizing the country.

Khrzhanovskiy says that Israelis enjoy "endemic impunity" to commit human rights abuses and ethnic cleansing against locals, and maintains that only international pressure or direct intervention like UN peacekeeping missions can stop it. According to some of his testimonies, when Palestinians or international activists – himself included – are victims of settler assaults (which he characterizes as pogroms) and report to the Israeli authorities, either they are the ones to get arrested on those charges, or settlers are directly joined in their violence by state forces. He was involved in 13 civil lawsuits with Israeli authorities as of May 2025; however, he has denounced the fact that, unlike him, Palestinians are tried in military courts.

When asked to comment on the attitude of the Israeli and Russian authorities vis-à-vis dissidents, he said that, while Russia is a "classic fascist dictatorship" towards anyone who disagrees with the government, Israel is rooted in ethnic supremacy – giving Jews "a remarkable amount of political freedom" while keeping Palestinians in a condition "worse than that of [dissidents] in Russia". Because of this, he has reported attempts from Knesset members to revoke his Israeli citizenship, stating "If I were Palestinian and I was doing this, I would have been dead. If I were an international and I was doing this, I would have been deported a long time ago." He has likened Russia jailing dissidents over stickers to Israel jailing Palestinians over Facebook posts.

According to Khrzhanovskiy, Israeli society and institutions show a generalized genocidal attitude towards Palestinians, and "will not be satisfied until Palestinians are completely gone." He has claimed that the murder of Palestinian children has been normalized as a means to prevent "terrorism", and has blamed continued violence on "decades of dehumanization" similar to the one behind the genocides of the 20th century. He has also contrasted the support of the Russian opposition for Israel's genocide with their preoccupation for human rights in Russia.

== Personal life ==
When he first settled in Tel Aviv in 2022, Khrzhanovskiy was married; he has since divorced from his wife. As of July 2026, he had been living for two and a half years in the West Bank, being hosted by Palestinian families and moving from village to village every few days; in May 2026, he was staying in Beit Jala. Due to his close contact with Palestinians and his estrangement from Israeli society, he no longer identifies as Israeli, even though he has expressed gladness for his Israeli citizenship allowing him to be an activist.

== See also ==
- Human rights violations against Palestinians by Israel
- Killing of Awdah Hathaleen – 2025 shooting in the Hebron Hills, Palestine
- Artyom Kirpichenok – Russian-Israeli historian (born 1975)
- Israel–Russia relations
- Palestine–Russia relations
