= Jasper Nathaniel =

American journalist (born 1987)

Jasper Diamond Nathaniel (born November 1987) is an American journalist who covers the Israeli occupation of the West Bank.

== Early life and education ==
Nathaniel is Jewish. His maternal grandmother was a Holocaust survivor from Poland, and his grandfather was a Soviet Jew who escaped antisemitic pogroms in the country, both finding themselves in the Bronx, New York after losing most of their family members; his paternal grandparents were Iraqi Jews from Baghdad who fled for Queens, New York amid a wave of anti-Jewish sentiment stemming from Nazi German propaganda, pan-Arabism and Arab nationalism.

Nathaniel graduated with a Bachelor of Arts in Psychology from the College of Literature, Science, and the Arts of the University of Michigan–Ann Arbor in 2010. In 2023, he enrolled in New York University's Arthur L. Carter Journalism Institute, where he is pursuing a Master of Arts in Cultural Reporting & Criticism.

== Career ==
After graduating from college, Nathaniel worked for technology startup companies until 2020. During the COVID-19 pandemic, Nathaniel wrote on Substack about his travels in the U.S. and East Africa. He has been a writing coach since 2022.

Nathaniel travelled to the West Bank in January 2024. He told the Columbia Journalism Review that he was inspired to report from the West Bank due to several shootings of Palestinians there following the 2023 October 7 attacks. Nathaniel has contributed to Zeteo, The Drift, Drop Site News, The Baffler and The Paris Review.

In 2025, Nathaniel reported extensively on the case of Mohammed Zaher Ibrahim, a Palestinian American teenager who was detained by Israel over allegations of throwing stones.

In October 2025, Nathaniel recorded an Israeli settler attack on Palestinian farmers in the olive fields near Turmus Ayya, during which Afaf Abu Alia, a Palestinian woman, was beaten unconscious by a settler while harvesting olives, resulting in her being hospitalised. Nathaniel stated the Israel Defense Forces (IDF) troops stationed in the area had abandoned him and the Palestinians to the settlers, despite having warned the IDF that they feared for their safety. He also criticized American media for its lack of coverage of the attack.

In October 2026, Nathaniel assisted Washington Post photojournalist Heidi Levine after she was attacked by Israeli settlers in Abu Falah in the occupied West Bank. He was the first to reach Levine during the attack and helped bring her to safety, while Palestinian youths threw stones to hold back the attackers.

On October 28, Nathaniel was physically assaulted by settlers in the village of Umm al-Khair, Hebron, along with fellow activists Adele Shoko and Andrey X; according to Shoko, Israeli forces pepper-sprayed and arrested him shortly after the incident. The following day, Shoko reported that Nathaniel and Andrey X had been released but forbidden to enter the West Bank for 60 days. In a video posted on November 1, Khrzhanovskiy said he and Nathaniel had been "nearly killed" in the attack, and confirmed Shoko's account of the events. He added that while in custody, he and Nathaniel were kept awake and interrogated for several hours during the night. The Committee to Protect Journalists (CPJ) denounced Israeli authorities for detaining the two on unclear legal grounds while "failing to hold those responsible for the violence accountable." After his release, Nathaniel said that they were "charged with assault, along with five other offenses", and also confirmed they had been barred from the West Bank for two months while the attacking settlers had faced no legal repercussions.

== Personal life ==
Nathaniel lives in Brooklyn, New York. As of June 2026, he is dating actress and comedian Hannah Einbinder.
