= 1937–38 in Mandatory Palestine football =

Football in Mandatory Palestine
- Season: 1937–38

The 1937–38 season was the 11th season of competitive football in the British Mandate for Palestine under the Eretz Israel Football Association.

== IFA Competitions ==
=== 1937 Palestine League ===
The second part of the 1937 Palestine League was held in autumn 1937, starting with a Tel Aviv derby, played on 9 October 1937, after the league schedule was disturbed by a disagreement between Hapoel and Maccabi factions in the Eretz Israel Football Association. The competition's final matches was played on 27 November 1937, and the league was won by Maccabi Tel Aviv For the first time, a second division was operated, called Mahlaka Bet and was split to north and south divisions. Hapoel Herzliya and Maccabi Nes Tziona were promoted to the top division.

==== League table ====
Pos	Team	Pld	W	D	L	GF	GA	GR	Pts	
1	Maccabi Tel Aviv	8	7	0	1	28	10	2.800	14	Champions
2	Hapoel Tel Aviv	8	5	1	2	20	9	2.222	11	
3	Hakoah Tel Aviv	8	2	3	3	13	18	0.722	7	
4	Hapoel Haifa	8	2	1	5	13	22	0.591	5	
5	Maccabi Petah Tikva	8	1	1	6	9	24	0.375	3	

Updated to match(es) played on 27 November 1937. Source: IFA, The Palestine Post

=== 1938 Palestine League ===
League matches started early in 1938 and continued until the summer season break. The competition was carried on after the end of the season, before being abandoned altogether by January 1939.

=== 1938 Palestine Cup ===
Hapoel Tel Aviv and Maccabi Tel Aviv met in the final, played on 28 May 1938, with Hapoel winning 2–1 to claim its second consecutive cup.

28 May 1938

Hapoel Tel Aviv	2–1	Maccabi Tel Aviv
Poliakov 10'; Nudelman 50'		25' (pen.) Neufeld

Maccabiah Stadium
Referee: Jastrzembski

== National team ==
=== 1938 World Cup Qualification ===
The EIFA entered a team to the 1938 World Cup, and was placed in Group 6 of the qualification rounds, along with Greece and Hungary. First, the national team faced Greece in a two-legged tie, with the winner advancing to meet Hungary for a sport in the finals.

22 January 1938 1938 WCQ	Mandatory Palestine	1–3	Greece	Tel-Aviv, Palestine/Eretz Israel
	Neufeld 36'	Report	Vikelidis 15', 30'; Migiakis 73'	Stadium: Maccabiah Stadium; Attendance: 8,000; Referee: Mohammed Youssef (Egypt)

20 February 1938 1938 WCQ	Greece	1–0	Mandatory Palestine	Athens, Greece
	Vikelidis 88' (pen.)	Report		Stadium: Stadio Leoforos Alexandras; Attendance: 12,000; Referee: Mika Popovic (Yugoslavia)

Greece qualified for the second round.

After the match against Greece, the national team played a match against a Piraeus XI, and won the match 2–0, with goals scored by Gaul Machlis and Natan Panz.

== Notable events ==
- Austria Wien played three matches in Tel Aviv and Haifa, two against the national team, winning 1–0 and 4–0, and one against Maccabi Tel Aviv, winning 6–2.
- During late 1937 the Arab Palestine Sports Federation ceased its activities, due to the Arab revolt, leaving the Arab clubs without a governing organization.
