= 1932–33 in Mandatory Palestine football =

Football in Mandatory Palestine
- Season: 1932–33

The 1932–33 season was the sixth season of competitive football in the British Mandate for Palestine under the Eretz Israel Football Association and the 1st under the Arab Palestine Sports Federation.

== IFA Competitions ==
=== 1932–33 Palestine League ===
Due to a dispute between Hapoel and Maccabi the 1932–33 Palestine League, which started on 29 October 1932, was played with Maccabi teams only. After the dispute was settled in early 1933, the league was abandoned.

==== Table ====
Pos	Team	Pld	W	D	L	GF	GA	GR	Pts
1	Maccabi Petah Tikva	10	7	1	2	17	9	1.889	15
2	Maccabi Tel Aviv	9	6	2	1	23	8	2.875	14
3	Maccabi Hashmonai	8	4	1	3	14	7	2.000	9
4	Maccabi Haifa	7	2	3	2	9	7	1.286	7
5	Maccabi Nes Tziona	9	2	2	5	12	21	0.571	6
6	Maccabi Rehovot	10	3	0	7	8	26	0.308	6
7	Maccabi Hadera	9	1	3	5	9	14	0.643	5

Updated to match(es) played on 4 March 1933. Source: Football Association League During the British Mandate 1930-1948, p. 21

=== 1933 Palestine Cup ===
The cup was contested by Jewish clubs only, as Arab and British teams didn't enter the competition. Both Tel Aviv clubs reached the final, Maccabi winning by a single late goal.

=== Final ===
10 June 1933

Hapoel Tel Aviv	0–1	Maccabi Tel Aviv
		89' Ya'akobi

Maccabi Petah Tikva ground
Attendance: 5000
Referee: Adler

== Arab Palestine Sports Federation ==
A national league was organized for Arab clubs, which was won by Arab Sports Club from Jerusalem.

Pos	Team	Pld	W	D	L	GF	GA	GD	Pts
1	Arab Sports Club Jerusalem	12	–	–	–	27	10	+17	19
2	Moslem Sports Club Jaffa	12	–	–	–	25	12	+13	16
3	Salazin Sports Club Haifa	12	–	–	–	16	14	+2	15
4	Young Greek Orthodox Jaffa	12	–	–	–	29	22	+7	14
5	Moslem Sports Club Haifa	12	–	–	–	13	20	−7	10
6	Rawdat Sports club Jerusalem	12	–	–	–	12	20	−8	6
7	White Star Haifa	12	0	0	12	7	27	−20	0
