= Sport in Palestine =

Palestine first competed at the Summer Olympics in 1996. The Palestinian National Authority is represented on the International Olympic Committee by the Palestine Olympic Committee, which has sent teams to compete at each Summer Olympics since 1996 under the IOC country code PLE. Palestine has been recognized as a member of the Olympic Council of Asia (OCA) since 1986, and the International Olympic Committee (IOC) since 1995. The Palestinian Olympic committee did not work with the Israeli Olympic committee to train for the 2012 Olympic games, and participation in the 2013 Mediterranean Games.

Association football has been described as the national sport of Palestine, and it is also the most popular. There is a West Bank Premier League, and Gaza Strip League. The Palestine national football team played Afghanistan in the 2014 FIFA World Cup qualifiers. They visited Australia for the 2015 AFC Asian Cup. Some girls' schools have incorporated football into their curricula. Prior to the creation of Israel, dozens of Palestinian sport clubs were active, however the 1948 war brought most of these to a closure.

The Beit Jala Lions is a West Bank Rugby Union team.

Ramallah hosts some of the best gyms in Palestine. The separation wall and numerous checkpoints has caused difficulty in movement for Palestinian athletes, however Palestinian athletes were still able to reach East Jerusalem sport centers as of 2009.

The Turmus Aya Equestrian Club, established in 2007, is a riding club dedicated to the mission of providing affordable access to horses for Palestinians. Ashraf Rabi, the founder, maintains that "this is part of the development of Palestine. Horses are a big part of our Arab culture, and we must embrace it."

The Arab Palestine Sports Federation was established in 1931 and re-established in 1944. The first wave of the federation was from 1931 to 1937, then again from 1944 to 1948. There were many different clubs and gyms from all over Palestine that were considered to be a part of the Federation. The main games that the Arab Palestine Sports Federation supported were football and weightlifting.

In 1948 when the federation failed, sport was not widely practiced throughout the region. Failure is credited to lack of resources and athletes in the area. After the failure of the federation, boxing became a phenomenon in Palestine. Boxing was brought to the region by British soldiers. While the soldiers were invading, tournaments were held around the area.

In January 2024, Irishman Stephen Redmond travelled to the West Bank and launched a campaign to raise funds for and set up GAA Palestine, in order to bring the Gaelic games (particularly football and hurling) to young people in the Ramallah area. £1,960 was raised to purchase equipment. Several other groups, such as Irish Sports for Palestine and Gaels against Genocide helped to connect the club with resources and people in Ireland to help set up the project. The original club, formerly Ramallah Hurling Club, was renamed to Moataz Sarsour GAA Club in honour of one of the club's volunteers, who was shot by Israeli forces and later pronounced dead in August 2024.

Later, in February 2025, the Tulkarm Governorate made a commitment to GAA Palestine to construct a GAA pitch for the community, and has sourced local manufacturers in the West Bank to produce hurleys. This is one of three planned GAA Clubs within the West Bank, the other two in Al Khalil and Bethlehem.

== See also ==
- Category:Sport in Mandatory Palestine
- Arab Palestine Sports Federation
- Palestine Marathon
- Palestine at the Olympics
