= Heidi Levine =

American photojournalist

- Injured by a stone during riots on the Temple Mount after Ramadan prayers on 25 February 1994.
- Born: 1962 or 1963 (age 63–64); Boston, Massachusetts, U.S.
- Education: University of Massachusetts, Amherst
- Occupation: Photojournalist

Heidi Levine (born 1962 or 1963) is an American freelance photojournalist who has worked for the Associated Press, Sipa Press, and The Washington Post. She has spent much of her career covering the Israeli–Palestinian conflict. In October 2026, she was hospitalized after being attacked by Israeli settlers in the West Bank.

== Early life and education ==
Levine was born and raised in Boston, Massachusetts. She is Jewish. Her father was passionate about photography, and bought Levine her first camera; they would walk around Boston taking pictures. Her first interest in the field was to photograph under-privileged areas of Boston and New York. At the University of Massachusetts, Amherst, she was the school paper photographer.

== Career ==
In 1983 during a school break, at age 21, she went to Israel to work for six weeks at a kibbutz. While there, she applied to the Associated Press and received a job offer. Figuring that working as a photojournalist would be educationally better than college journalism classes, she took the offer, and in 1983 started her photojournalism career in Israel as a staffer. In 1991, she joined the Sipa Press Photo Agency. Based in Israel, most of her coverage has been focused on the violence in Israel, Gaza and the West Bank. She has covered conflicts in Afghanistan, Kosovo, Iraq, Lebanon, Libya, and Syria on assignment. She has also covered topics such as female feticide in India, the COVID-19 pandemic, and the Syrian refugee crisis.

In 2013, Levine said that working at the Associated Press in Israel gave her experience in many facets of the field, including editing, lab activities, and interacting with subscribers. She faced difficulty with breaking into the field as a woman, describing it as a "boys club."

In 2015, she became the first person to win the Anja Niedringhaus Courage in Photojournalism Award in 2015 for her coverage of the 2014 Gaza war. Niedringhaus was a friend of Levine who died while working in Afghanistan.

In February 2022, she went to Ukraine on assignment for The Washington Post. While covering the Russian invasion of Ukraine, she photographed and commented on the aftermath of the Bucha massacre. She noted that "most of the images [she] took could never be published because they're too shocking."

Levine has covered the Gaza war. She has described covering the Israeli–Palestinian conflict as "very, very personal" and intimate.

Her pictures have been published in many outlets, including The Washington Post, The New York Times, Stern, National Geographic, Paris Match, L'Express, Newsweek, Time, The New York Times Magazine, The Sunday Times Magazine, Forbes, and The Globe and Mail.

== 2026 attack by Israeli settlers ==
On October 16, 2026, Levine, along with several Palestinian olive farmers, was attacked by a group of 80 Israeli settlers while reporting on the Palestinian olive harvest at Abu Falah in the occupied West Bank. The settlers threw stones and lit trees on fire. According to the New York Times, Levine was caught behind the settlers who hit her with sticks and kicked her on the ground. The Washington Post, for which she was reporting, stated that she was wearing a vest identifying her as a member of the press, and was robbed of her phone and cameras. According to witnesses, Israeli soldiers who arrived fired tear gas at the Palestinians and did not attempt to control the settlers. The Palestinian Red Crescent reported that 3 Palestinians were injured. Levine was taken to a hospital in Ramallah with multiple lacerations, a broken rib, four broken vertebrae and a ripped finger. According to her son, she was also bruised and punctured and her neck was cut when settlers yanked her necklace. She was transferred to Rabin Medical Center in Petah Tikva, to receive surgery on her finger, including a skin graft.

In a video statement made from the hospital, Levine said, "Today I was brutally attacked," adding, "We saw in the distance, in the hilltop, I would say at least 50 masked men, slingshots. And when they came running down, I was attacked, pushed to the ground," and "they just kept kicking me and kicking me." According to colleague Jasper Nathaniel, Levine was provided cover by young Palestinian men who threw rocks at the attacking settlers, without whom "Heidi could be dead". The following day, Israeli settlers attacked a group of French diplomats near Taybeh.

=== Reaction ===
Several US lawmakers called for an investigation into the attack on Levine, including Jamie Raskin and Chris Coons. A US State Department official condemned the violence, saying "We condemn criminal violence by any party in the West Bank and support appropriate investigations as well as legal accountability for those responsible." US Secretary of State Marco Rubio expressed the need to find out the full story and said that the US asked Israel to "crack down on that stuff". U.S. Representative Rosa DeLauro also wrote on the social media platform X: “If the settlers will do this to an American journalist on camera, in broad daylight, imagine what Palestinian families face when no one is watching,” Mike Huckabee, the US ambassador to Israel, described the attack as a "despicable act of terror" and called for the arrest and prosecution of those responsible. The Committee to Protect Journalists wrote that the attack on Levine was "part of a disturbing pattern of violence and harassment against journalists regardless of their nationalities."

The attack was condemned by the Union of Journalists and the Foreign Press Association in Israel. Levine was visited by politician Yair Golan in the hospital who pledged to fight Jewish and Palestinian "terror". Israeli president Isaac Herzog phoned Levine to apologize for the attack and said that it "does not represent the citizens and values of the State of Israel". The office of Israeli prime minister Benjamin Netanyahu issued a statement saying it was unclear what happened and was being investigated. His office stated that: "200 Arabs and far-left activists confronted approximately 40 Israeli youths. Footage shows masked individuals on both sides hurling objects, amid reports of fireworks fired at Jewish youths." Levine told the Associated Press that she was "shocked and insulted" by Netanyahu referring to the attack as "alleged", and added that he "had all the evidence on the table." She also stated that the Palestinians present during the attack had protected her from the settlers. Levine's son expressed anger at Netanyahu's response and criticized Israeli social media users for depicting her as a "leftist traitor", stating that she has "risked her life again and again to cover the truth and show the Israeli side".

=== Arrests ===
On 19 October, Israeli security forces arrested 10 settlers suspected of participating in violence, including two for attacking the French diplomats and four for attacking Levine. Israel does not typically arrest settlers accused of violence against Palestinians. The four suspected of attacking Levine were released to house arrest a few days later after a court determined there was insufficient evidence to extend their detainment. Levine stated that she did not believe that her assailants would face legal consequences. In a 12 November interview on Haaretz's podcast, Levine said that she was unsurprised that the worst attack in her career came from Israeli settlers based on previous settler violence against herself and Palestinians. She said that no arrests had been made and none of her property had been recovered.

== Personal life ==
Levine moved to Israel in the 1980s. She has lived in Jerusalem and Tel Aviv, and has three children. In Jerusalem, she lived in a neighborhood with both Jewish and Arab residents to expose her children to people of different backgrounds. Levine was married to Israeli photographer Moshe Milner for 25 years.

Levine says she has had to make compromises that would not allow her "to be the best photographer [she] wished to be." She feels that the power of photography can make a difference by raising awareness and evoking empathy for those affected by conflicts and crises. She has the "ability to capture the essence of conflicts and their impact on people's lives." She has "depth of compassion for the people she encounters," and "a passion for bearing witness."

== Awards ==
- 1997 First prize at the International Scoop and Journalism Festival in Angers, France, for her work in Hebron.
- 2015 Bayeux Award for war correspondents, for her photo series titled "Healing and Resilience in Gaza"
- 2015 UNICEF Photo of the year award
- 2015 Anja Niedringhaus Courage in Photojournalism Award, for her work in Gaza
- 2021 Picture of the Year Award of Excellence
- 2022 Local Testimony, First Prize Breaking News award for her coverage titled "Violence in Lod"
- 2023 International Women's Media Foundation award for courage in journalism, as part of the "Women of The Washington Post Reporting on Ukraine"
