= 1947 Palestine Premier League =

Palestine Premier League
- Season: 1947
- Champions: Shabab al-Arab Haifa

The 1947 Palestine Premier League was the third edition of the first tier in the Arab Palestinian football league system, organized by the APSF. The champion was Shabab al-Arab Haifa, defeating Islamic Sports Club Jaffa 5–1 in the final, which was played in Jerusalem and winning the trophy for the second time in a row. This was the last edition of the Palestine Premier League before the 1948 Arab–Israeli War.
