= 1945 Palestine Premier League =

Palestine Premier League
- Season: 1944–45
- Champions: Islamic Club Sport Jaffa

The 1945 Palestine Premier League was the first edition of the first tier in the Arab Palestinian football league system (organised by the APSF). The league champions and winners of the trophy, named Arab Bank Shield, was Islamic Sport Club Jaffa.

== Competition format ==
Clubs affiliated to the APSF split into six regional leagues. The champion of each of the six regions advanced to the Palestine championship.

== Results ==
=== Semi-finals ===
Home team	Score	Away team
Orthodox Club Jerusalem	1–0	Dajani Sports Club
Islamic Sport Club Jaffa	3–2	Shabab al-Arab Haifa

=== Final ===
3 June 1945

Orthodox Club Jerusalem	0–2	Islamic Sport Club Jaffa
		Najjar

Jerusalem
