= Artyom Kirpichenok =

Russian-Israeli historian (born 1975)

- Артём Кирпичёнок ארטיום קירפיצ׳ונוק
- Kirpichenok in 2017
- Born: Artyom Ivanovich Kirpichenok; 16 April 1975 (age 51); Leningrad, Russian SFSR, Soviet Union
- Citizenship: Russia; Israel
- Occupations: Historian; writer; tour guide

Academic background
- Education: Hebrew University of Jerusalem

Academic work
- Discipline: Slavic studies; history of Israel
- Institutions: Hebrew University of Jerusalem; Simon Dubnow Institute for Jewish History and Culture; Library of the Russian Academy of Sciences; Center for Arab-Eurasian Studies in Cairo; Imperial Orthodox Palestine Society

Artyom Ivanovich Kirpichenok or Kirpichyonok (Russian: Артём Иванович Кирпичёнок; Hebrew: ארטיום קירפיצ׳ונוק; born 16 April 1975) is a Russian-Israeli historian and opinion journalist. Kirpichenok previously resided in Israel for 10 years, where he became a critic of Zionism and subsequently returned to Russia.

== Early life and education ==
Artyom Kirpichenok was born in 1975 in Leningrad (St. Petersburg). In the 1990s, he moved to Israel, where he lived for about 15 years, serving in the Israeli army. He earned a bachelor's degree in History and a master's degree in Philosophy from the Hebrew University of Jerusalem. He received his Ph.D. degree from the Department of Slavic Studies of the same university with thesis "Serbian Settlements in Ukraine in the Mid-18th Century", published as a monograph in Russian, Сербские поселения на Украине в середине XVIII века (St. Petersburg, 2007).

== Career ==
Kirpichenok worked as a visiting lecturer in the Department of Slavic Studies at the Hebrew University and taught at the Simon Dubnow Institute for Jewish History and Culture. In 2005, he returned to St. Petersburg to reside permanently. He worked at the Library of the Russian Academy of Sciences and participated in academic conferences on the history of the Balkans and the Middle East.

In 2007, his monograph Serbian Settlements in Ukraine in the Mid-18th Century—based on his dissertation research—was published. Subsequently, Kirpichenok also focused on the history and politics of Israel and the Middle East. His book A People's History of Israel was released in 2019, followed by Hungary 1956: A Different Perspective in 2022 and Israel: The Road to Catastrophe in 2024. In addition to these works, he published articles and delivered lectures on the history of Israel, Zionism, and Middle Eastern politics. In 2025, he held the position of Head of the Slavic Studies Department at the Center for Arab-Eurasian Studies in Cairo. He became a full member of the Imperial Orthodox Palestine Society (IOPS). He was active as a critic of Israel's actions in the Gaza war, Benjamin Netanyahu, and their actions towards the Palestinian population.

Kirpichyonok studied the history of St. Petersburg and conducted city tours. In 2026, the AST publishing house released his book St. Petersburg: A Guide for Scooters and Bicycles.

== 2026 arrest in Israel ==
On 4 August 2026, Kirpichenok traveled to Israel for a conference and went missing at Ben Gurion Airport. Former Russian lawmaker Daria Mitina claimed Kirpichenok was detained by Shin Bet at the airport. The Russian embassy in Israel learned of the detention "after the fact from the media" and submitted an inquiry to the Israeli authorities. On 19 August, the scholar's friends and acquaintances launched a campaign in his support and a petition demanding his release. In their view, Kirpichenok's detention constitutes political persecution.

A criminal case was opened against Kirpichenok, and according to media reports, he is facing charges. A publication ban has been imposed on the case materials, while his family claims he is being politically persecuted. By 4 September, it had become known that he was charged with espionage, with a blanket gag order for details. Any possibility of contact with Kirpichenok was lost after his lawyer, Inna Lebedinskaya-Katz, was also detained and jailed by Israeli authorities on 11 October, reportedly over "collaboration with an agent of a foreign state"; a gag order was issued for her case as well.

== See also ==
- Andrey X – Russian-Israeli journalist and human rights activist (born 1998)
- Israel–Russia relations
