= 1946 Palestine Premier League =

Second edition in the first tier in the Arab-Palestinian football league system

Palestine Premier League
- Season: 1946
- Champions: Shabab al-Arab Haifa

1946 Palestine Premier League was the second edition in the first tier in the Arab Palestinian football league system, organized by the APSF. The champion was Shabab al-Arab Haifa, defeating Islamic Sports Club Jaffa in the final to win its 1st title.
