= Turmus Aya Equestrian Club =

Palestinian equestrian club

The Turmus Ayya Equestrian Club is an equestrian club in the town of Turmus Ayya, Palestine. It offers stabling and care for private horse owners. The club also trains riders in jumping and dressage.

The club was founded by Ashraf Rabi in 2007. Rabi was born in Turmus Ayya and moved to Panama at 16 year old, and from there to America. He dreamed of one day returning to his homeland and build a house with a stable full-something he achieved in 2000.

Rabi built his dream house and stable. He noticed the local children frequently visited his house to see and ride the horses. That led him to build an equestrian club to make horseback riding accessible for all Palestinians. Rabi is aware that “This sport is recognized as the most expensive sport worldwide" and his dream is to change that, and make horseback riding "available for everybody.”

Rabi has a horse farm in the United States where he breeds Arabian horses.

Al-Frangi, who had been riding horses for ten years and was a member of the Palestinian National Jumping Team, stated “When we are competing at any place outside of the country, when they see us riding they are impressed that we really know how to ride” says Al-Frangi. “They ask how we can ride the way we do without having anything in Palestine.” Al-Frangi says Palestinians are currently at a major disadvantage on the world stage. They lack proper funding and cannot even bring their own horses to competitions because of challenges with transporting animals through the authoritarian Israeli customs.
