= Hapoel HaDarom Tel Aviv F.C. =

Hapoel HaDarom Tel Aviv
- Full name: Hapoel HaDarom Tel Aviv Football Club הפועל הדרום תל אביב
- Founded: 1936
- Dissolved: 1961
- 1960–61: Liga Bet South A, 8th

Hapoel HaDarom Tel Aviv (Hebrew: הפועל הדרום תל אביב) was an Israeli football club based in Tel Aviv. The club reached the final of the 1937 Palestine Cup, where they lost 0–3 to their parent club, Hapoel Tel Aviv. The club later reformed and played at the lower tiers of the Israeli league until it merged in 1961 with Hapoel Kiryat Shalom.

== History ==
The club was formed in 1936. Hapoel HaDarom played in the 1936 Palestine Cup, where they drew 1–1 with Maccabi Hasmonean Jerusalem. The 1936 Palestine Cup was eventually stopped after three matches due to the outbreak of the 1936–39 Arab revolt.

In the 1937 Palestine Cup, Hapoel HaDarom defeated Maccabi Avshalom Petah Tikva 5–2 in the Quarter-finals and qualified for the Semi-finals, where they faced Maccabi Tel Aviv. Hapoel HaDarom upset Maccabi Tel Aviv with a 2–1 victory, to set a meeting with its parent club, Hapoel Tel Aviv in the final. The victory was assisted by a penalty imposed on the senior Maccabi Tel Aviv squad for boycotting Maccabi's match against Aris Thessaloniki in April 1937. Due to the penalty, Maccabi had to field its youth team for the match. In the final, Hapoel HaDarom was defeated 0–3 by Hapoel Tel Aviv.

The club reformed at the beginning of the 1957–58 season and was placed in Liga Gimel. At the end of the 1959–60 season, Hapoel HaDarom were promoted to Liga Bet, the third tier of Israeli football at the time, after they finished at the top four of the Promotion play-offs for Liga Gimel clubs. In 1961, a mixed team of Hapoel HaDarom and Hapoel Kiryat Shalom played in a training match against the Israel national team, in which they lost 0–8. The two clubs merged prior to the 1961–62 season, to form Hapoel HaDarom Kiryat Shalom, a name used until the 1963–64 season, after which it was dropped and Hapoel Kiryat Shalom continued as a separate club from the following season.
