= Olive cultivation in Palestine =

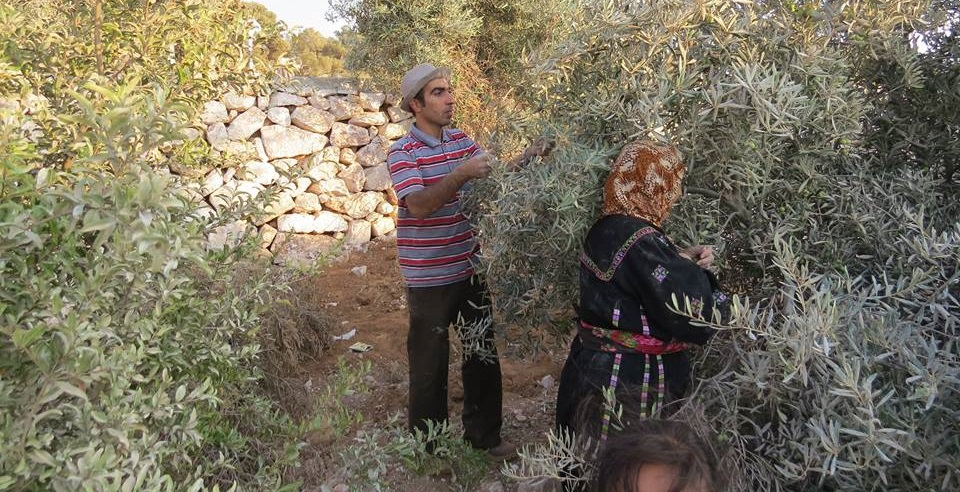
Palestinian Olive harvest in 2014

Olive trees are a major agricultural crop in Palestine, where they are mostly grown for olive oil production. It has been estimated that olive production accounted for 57% of cultivated land in Palestine, with 7.8 million fruit-bearing olive trees in 2011. In 2014, an estimated 108,000 tonnes of olives were pressed, producing 24,700 tonnes of olive oil, which contributed US $109 million in added value to the crop. Around 100,000 households rely on olives for income.

The olive tree is seen by many Palestinians as being a symbol of nationality and connection to the land, particularly due to its slow growth and longevity. The destruction of Palestinian olive trees has become a feature of the Israeli–Palestinian conflict, with regular reports of damage by Israeli settlers. In May 2023 a United Nations report stated that some 50,000 olive trees had been vandalised by settlers in less than 5 years.

== History ==
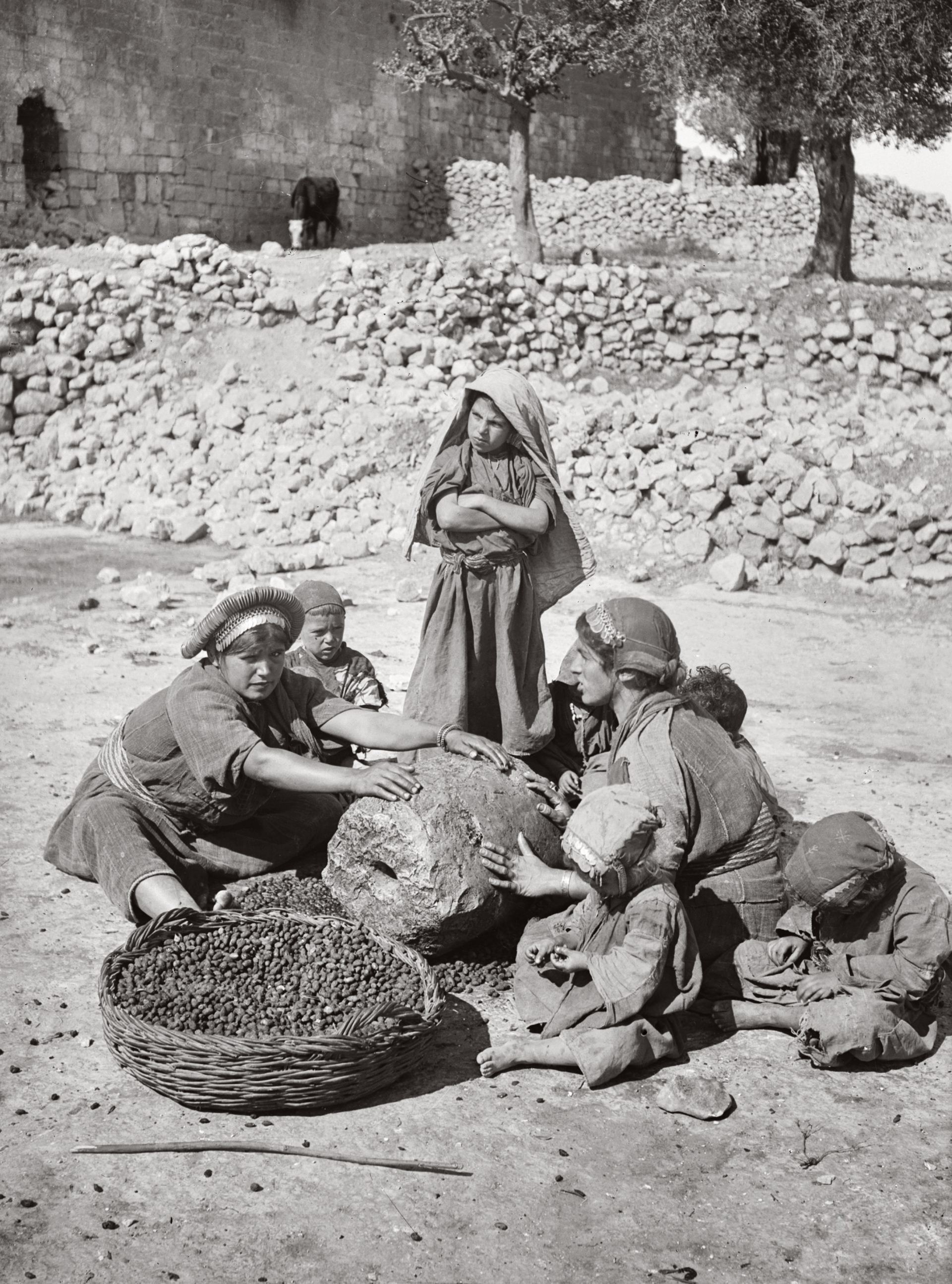
Palestinian women crushing olives in order to make olive oil, 1900–1920.

Olive trees have been cultivated in the region for many thousands of years, with some evidence of olive groves and olive oil technologies dating to the Chalcolithic period, between 3600–3300 BCE. Later in the Bronze Age, olive fruits were widely traded as shown by the Uluburun shipwreck – which may have been carrying an olive shipment from Palestine.

Olives and olive oil had a significant role in all of the major religions which developed in the region. In the Jewish scriptures, olives were seen as part of the blessings of the Promised land and were a symbol of prosperity. In the New Testament, the Mount of Olives has an important role and the anointing with oil is part of Christian and Islamic religious practice.

In the period between 1700 and 1900, the area around Nablus had developed to be the major area for olive production, and the olive oil was used in lieu of money. The oil was stored in deep wells in the ground in the city and surrounding villages which was then used by merchants to make payments.

By the late 19th century, cash crops in Ottoman Palestine were being rapidly expanded, and by 1914 there were 475 thousand dunam of olive groves (about 47.5 thousand hectares or 112 thousand acres) across the area that was part of the Ottoman Empire.

In the late Ottoman period before the First World War, olive oil produced near Nablus was hard to export due to its relatively high acidity, high price, and limited shelf-life.

During the British Mandate era, production of olives more than doubled from the 1920s to the 1940s.

After the occupation of Palestine, Israeli forces targeted olive trees as a primary form of land acquisition and began to uproot Palestinian olive trees in 1967, with an estimated 830,000 olive trees uprooted between 1967 and 2009.

The olive harvest was the primary source of income for Palestinians during the first Intifada and was so essential for the Palestinian communities that public institutions, universities, and public schools closed for the olive season so as many people as possible could help with the harvest.

In 2014, UNESCO designated Battir as a World Heritage site because of its agricultural significance as its olive production characterizes the landscape through "extensive agricultural terraces, water springs, ancient irrigation systems, human-settlement remains, olive presses, and an historic core."

Currently, olive oil is an essential export for Palestinians in the West Bank. Marketing consultant Robert Massoud states, "There is very little Palestinians can export but olive oil." This dependence on olive oil exports is widespread throughout the West Bank to the point that, to most villagers, olive oil represents economic security.

== Production ==
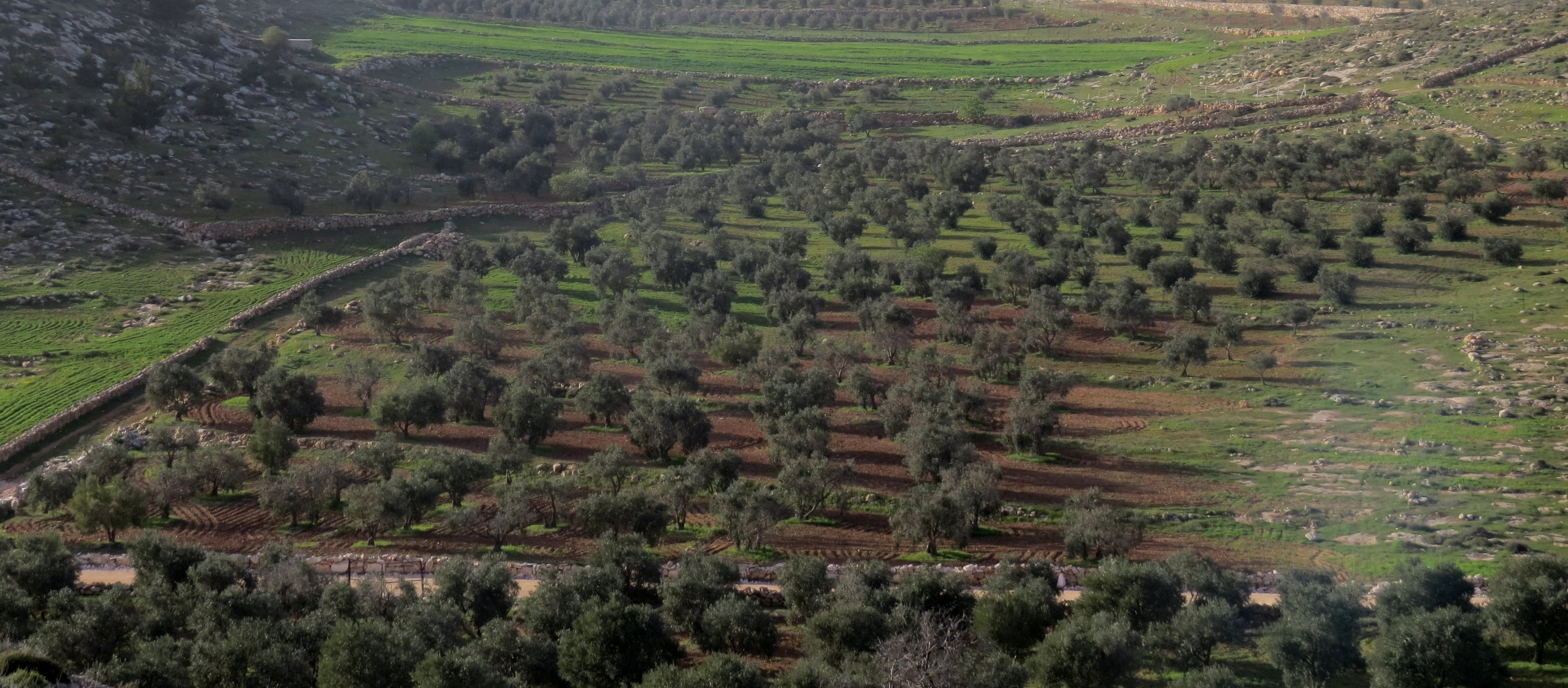
Olive fields in as-Samu

The vast majority of the olive harvest is pressed in the West Bank mostly around the town of Jenin where most of the olive oil presses are located.

Olive oil produced in Palestine is primarily consumed locally. The natural olive tree cycle of high-yield years followed by low-yield years has caused large fluctuations in production, but on average there is an excess of around 4,000 tonnes of olive oil produced per year. Of this, the biggest market is likely to be to Israel – although the data is not collected, making the destination of the oil hard to assess. The rest is exported to Europe, North America and the Gulf states. The International Olive Council estimates that the average production of Palestinian olive oil was 22,000 tonnes per year with 6,500 tonnes exported in 2014/15.

Palestinian olive press statistics 2014
	Total olives/ tonnes	Total olive oil pressed/ tonnes	Total added value/ million US $
Palestine	108379.1	24758.2	109
West Bank	88356.4	21241.5	91
Gaza	20022.6	3517.0	18

== Agronomy ==
The main olive cultivars used in Palestine are Chemlali, Jebbah, Barnea, Manzolino, Nabali Baladi, Nabali Mohassan, Shami and Souri. Molecular characterisation of Nabali Baladi, Nabali Mohassan and Surri cultivars from olive trees growing in the West Bank has shown that they are true cultivars with measurable differences.

== Culture ==
Olive trees are seen as being a major component of traditional Palestinian farming life, with several generations of families gathering together to harvest the olives for two months from mid-September. The harvest season is often associated with celebration for these families, and family and local community celebrations are organised with traditional Palestinian folk music and dancing.

Anthropologist Anne Meneley describes her olive-picking experience as community-oriented:

We are hot and dusty and sometimes clumsy as we negotiate the rough rocks that surround the olive trees. Our Palestinian hosts bring us most welcome cool water and juice and hot sweet tea and coffee. There is communitas of sorts in this shared labor: we feel that we are contributing something, however symbolic, to the Palestinian cause.

As olive cultivation is a significant aspect of Palestinian culture, the uprooting of olive trees by Israeli settlers is a prominent point of concern in Palestinian culture. Poet Mourid Barghouti describes olive trees as "the identity card that doesn't need stamps or photos and whose validity doesn't expire with the death of the owner" and "with each olive tree uprooted by Israeli bulldozers, a family tree of Palestinian peasants falls from the wall."

Religiously, "the Holy Books refer more often to the vine and the olive tree" than to prophets. Muslim teaching also holds olives in high regard as "the Almighty is even believed to have himself taken an oath by the olive tree."

More recently, the olive tree is a symbol of rootedness. After the 1982 Lebanon War, the olive became a symbol for Palestinian identity. Because "olive trees are a prominent feature of the mountainous region of the landscape in the West Bank," Palestinians began to "draw connections between their ancient presence in Palestine and that of the ancient olive tree rooted in the land of Palestine."

Olive trees also have a nationalist connotation in Palestinian culture. In a speech to the United Nations General Assembly in 1974, Yasser Arafat stated that Zionist terrorism targeted the olive tree because it "has been a proud symbol" and "living reminder that the land is Palestinian." He concluded the speech with a nationalist reference to the olive branch:

Today, I have come bearing an olive branch and a freedom-fighter's gun. Do not let the olive branch fall from my hand. I repeat: do not let the olive branch fall from my hand.

Arafat's remarks on the olive branch still influence literature today in works such as Raja Shehadeh's "Diary of an Internal Exile: Three Entries," in which she writes about his struggles as a resident of the West Bank. He concludes, "Arafat was right to hold a gun in one hand and an olive branch in the other. I was never so naive as to expect that Israel could be won over by the olive branch alone, but the gun could only ever be a means to an end."

== Israeli settler violence ==
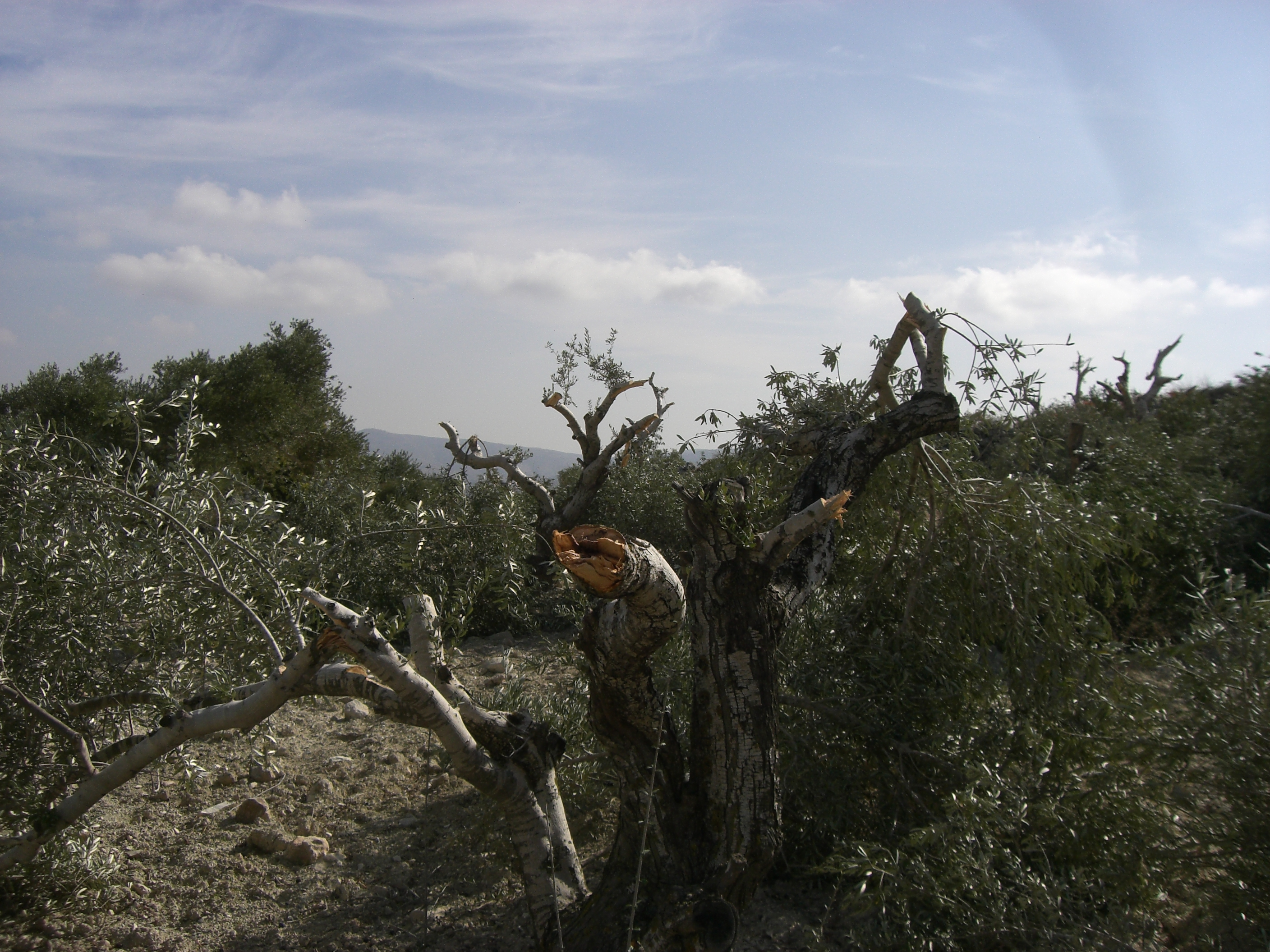
On November 12th, 2009, a group of 25 settlers from Yitzhar settlement, south of Nablus, cut down 97 olive trees in the Palestinian village of Burin

In her 2009 publication entitled Tree Flags, legal scholar and ethnographer, Irus Braverman, describes how Palestinians identify olive groves as an emblem or symbol of their longtime, steadfast agricultural connection (sumūd) to the land. Similar destruction of olive trees occurred in Jabal Jales (an area near Hebron) and in Huwara. The United Nations reported that by 2013, 11,000 olive trees owned by Palestinians in the occupied West Bank had been damaged or destroyed.

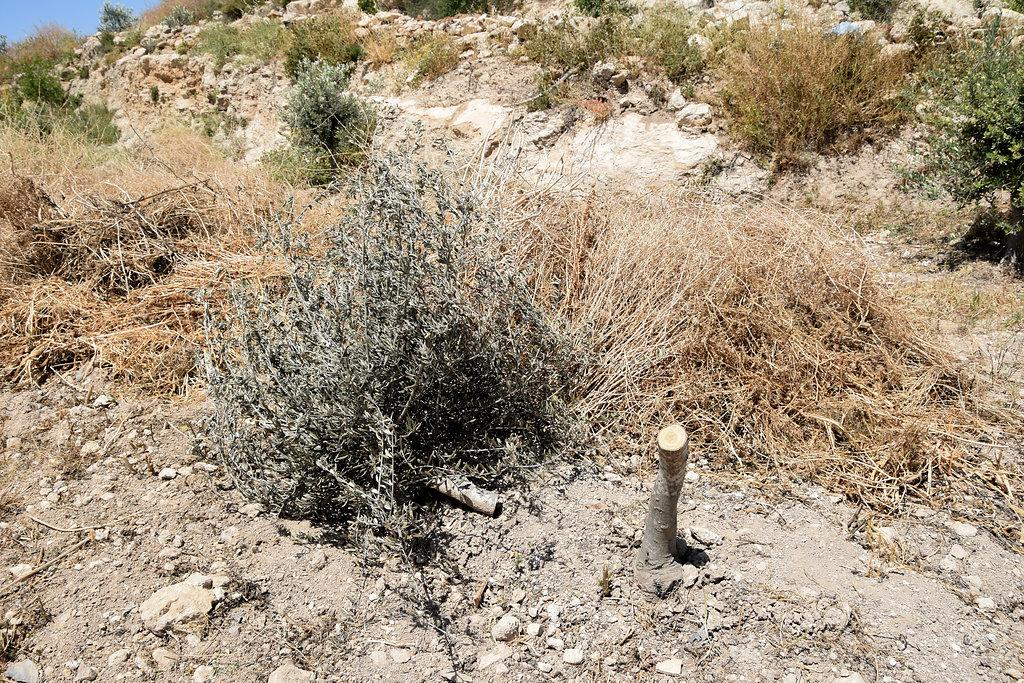
Olive tree vandalized by settlers on Hiyam Sabah’s land, village of ‘Urif, Nablus District. Photo by Salma a-Deb’i, B’Tselem, 29 April 2018

In 2012, Israel was urged to protect West Bank olive trees after trees were uprooted in al-Mughir, Turmusaya, Nablus, al-Khader, and Ras Karkar. In 2014, trees were uprooted in Deir Istiya and Wadi Qana, with some 800,000 to one million trees having been destroyed since 1967. In 2016, trees were uprooted to build a road in Qalqilya. In 2017 laborers began uprooting olive trees to build a bypass road near Azzun and Nabi Ilyas. According to international law an occupying power can only take land to build roads benefiting the residents or military needs specific to the occupied territory. In January 2017, B’Tselem reported there were approximately 60 kilometres (37 mi) of roads that Palestinians were prohibited from using. With the many trees being removed or vandalized, some 700 to 1000 years old and still bearing fruit, to build roads, other "improvements", as well as for the building of settlements, this has caused economic hardships, especially with families separated from their farmlands.

In October 2021, settlers vandalized 8,000 trees in the West Bank. In the first two weeks of the 2021 harvest, 18 incidents of damage to Palestinian olive groves, consisting of acts of battering or chopping down trees or denuding their fruits, were reported.

In the 2023 olive harvest season, Yesh Din reported 113 attacks by Israeli settlers and soldiers in the West Bank that disrupted olive harvest. The attacks caused 96,000 dunams of olive-planted land to go unharvested last year, resulting in approximately US$10,000,000 in losses. Approximately 1,340 olive trees were damaged by settlers in Qaryut in 2024. Over 150 attacks on olive pickers have been recorded in the 2025 olive harvest season.

In October 2026, as the annual olive harvest began, witnesses and medical sources reported that Israeli soldiers had backed settlers in seizing Palestinian olive groves across the occupied West Bank. The United Nations Office for the Coordination of Humanitarian Affairs reported 272 olive harvest-related settler attacks in 2026, resulting in one death, over 200 injuries, and damage to 3,200 olive trees and saplings.
