= 1937 Palestine League =

Palestine League
- Season: 1937
- Champions: Maccabi Tel Aviv; 2nd title
- Matches: 20
- Goals: 83 (4.15 per match)

The 1937 Palestine League was the fifth season of league football in the British Mandate for Palestine. The defending champions were Maccabi Tel Aviv.

Since due to the 1936–1939 Arab revolt the previous season ended at December 1936, the season started on 29 January 1937, playing the league in the spring-autumn format. Further delays caused this season to end on 27 November 1937, despite only five teams taking part in the league.

The championship was won by defending champions Maccabi Tel Aviv.

== League table ==
| Pos | Team | Pld | W | D | L | GF | GA | GR | Pts | | MTA | HTA | HKT | HHA | MPT |
|---|---|---|---|---|---|---|---|---|---|---|---|---|---|---|---|
| 1 | Maccabi Tel Aviv | 8 | 7 | 0 | 1 | 28 | 10 | 2.800 | 14 | Champions | — | 1–3 | 8–1 | 3–2 | 5–2 |
| 2 | Hapoel Tel Aviv | 8 | 5 | 1 | 2 | 20 | 9 | 2.222 | 11 | | 0–1 | — | 2–2 | 5–0 | 4–1 |
| 3 | Hakoah Tel Aviv | 8 | 2 | 3 | 3 | 13 | 18 | 0.722 | 7 | | 0–3 | 0–1 | — | 2–2 | 4–0 |
| 4 | Hapoel Haifa | 8 | 2 | 1 | 5 | 13 | 22 | 0.591 | 5 | | 0–2 | 4–3 | 1–3 | — | 0–3 (Note: The match wasn't played and was awarded to Maccabi Petah Tikva.) |
| 5 | Maccabi Petah Tikva | 8 | 1 | 1 | 6 | 9 | 24 | 0.375 | 3 | | 2–5 | 0–1 | 1–1 | 3–1 | — |

Updated to match(es) played on 27 November 1937. Source: IFA, The Palestine Post

== See also ==
- 1937 Liga Bet
