= Turmus Ayya =

Palestinian village in Ramallah and al-Bireh Governorate, West Bank

- Municipality type D (Village council)

Arabic transcription(s)
  - Arabic: ترمسعيّا
  - Latin: Turmus'ayyeh (official); Tourmous Ayyeh (unofficial)
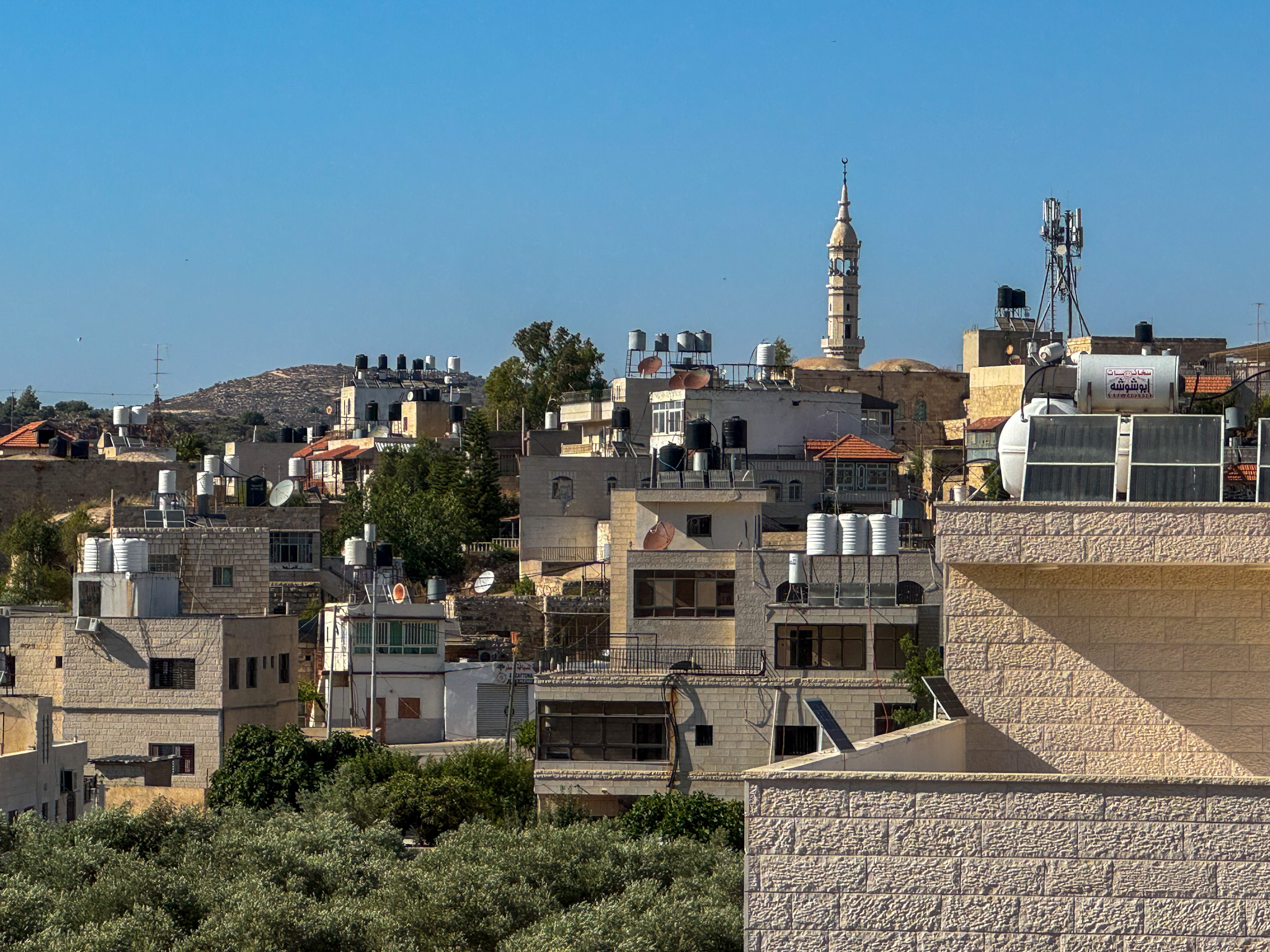
- Town center view of Turmus Ayya

- Location of Turmus 'Ayyā within Palestine
- Coordinates: 32°02′09″N 35°17′10″E
- Palestine grid: 177/160
- State: State of Palestine
- Governorate: Ramallah and al-Bireh
- Founded: Circa 800 BCE

Government
  - Type: Village council
  - Head of village council: Yaser Alkam

Area
  - Total: 17.6 km^{2} (6.8 sq mi)

Population (2017)
  - Total: 2,464
  - Density: 140/km^{2} (363/sq mi)
- Name meaning: Thormasia

Turmus Ayya or Turmus'ayyeh (Arabic: ترمسعيّا) is a Palestinian town in the Ramallah and al-Bireh Governorate of the West Bank. The Palestinian Central Bureau of Statistics recorded 2,464 residents in 2017.

Families from Turmus Ayya established businesses in the United States and Latin America in the 1960s, and later returned and invested money into local economy. Recent developments include agriculture infrastructure, date processing factories, construction, and equestrianism. Because of this, many of the town's residents hold American citizenship: the American Friends Service Committee estimated that more than 80% of residents held U.S. citizenship in 2023, while Ynetnews reported a figure of more than 90%, citing the mayor; The Guardian reported in August 2026 that about 80% of residents were U.S. citizens from New York, Chicago, and Paterson, often returning to the town during the summer.

Turmus Ayya also hosts the Hugo Chavez Ophthalmic Hospital, a government hospital that specializes in eye care and the only ophthalmic hospital in the West Bank.

The town has repeatedly been impacted by Israeli settler violence. Major incidents include the June 2023 terror attack which led to the murder of resident and father of two, Omar Qattin, and the murder of 14-year-old U.S. citizen Amer Rabea in April 2025.

== Etymology ==
The Applied Research Institute–Jerusalem (ARIJ) cites Palestinian historian Mustafa Murad al-Dabbagh's interpretation of Thormasia as a likley origin. Al-Dabbagh describes Thormasia as an Aramaic words associated with a mountain, remains from pressed grapes, and ruin or desolation.

Adolf Neubauer proposed another theory. He suggested the town is related to Thormasia, a place mentioned in the Talmud. Michael Avi-Yonah and Shemuel Yeivin proposed identifying Turmus Ayya with Tur Shimon, which is mentioned in rabbinic literature as having been destroyed during the Bar Kokhba revolt.

Another proposed explanation connects "Turmus" with the Latin word thermae, meaning a public bath. Under this interpretation, the settlement was originally called Ayya, with "Turmus" added after the construction of a bath during the Roman or Byzantine period.

== Geography ==
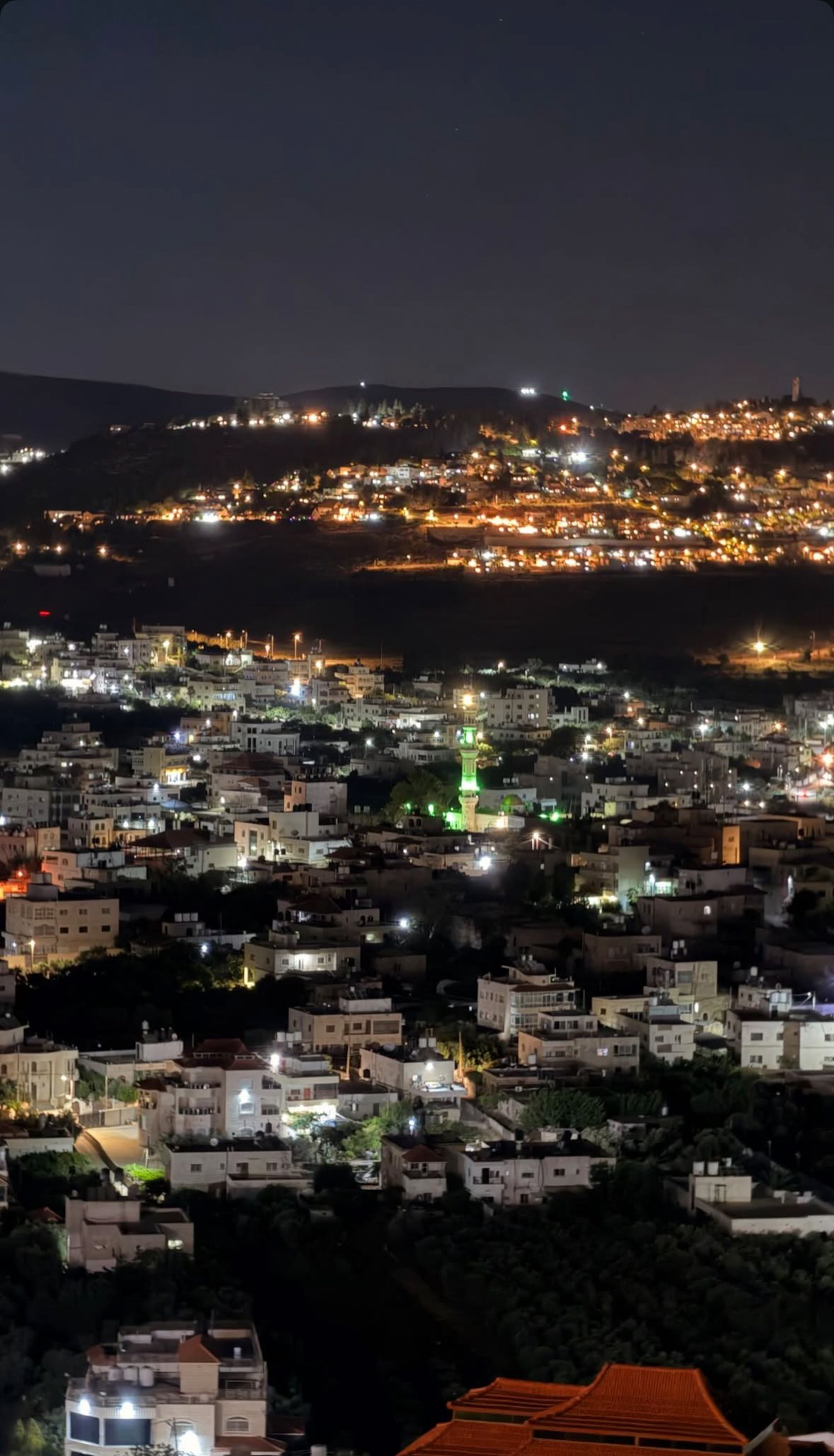
Night view of Turmus Ayya

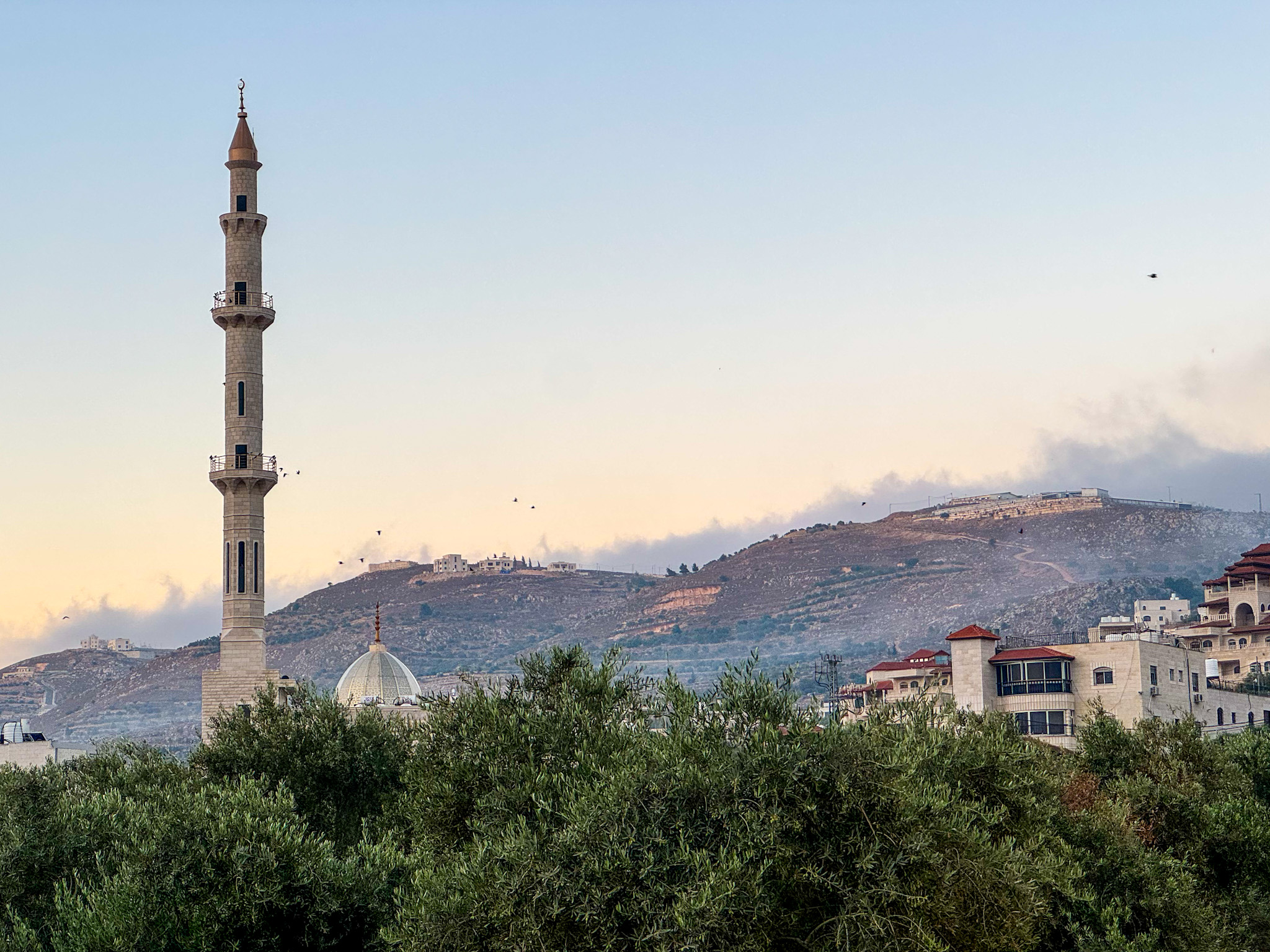
Hilly surroundings near Turmus Ayya

Turmus Ayya is about 22 kilometres (14 mi) northeast of Ramallah. Nearby Palestinian communities include Sinjil and Khirbet Abu Falah. The Israeli settlement of Shilo lies to the east. The town has an area of approximately 17,606 dunams, or 17.6 square kilometres. Its elevation is about 720 metres above sea level.

== History ==
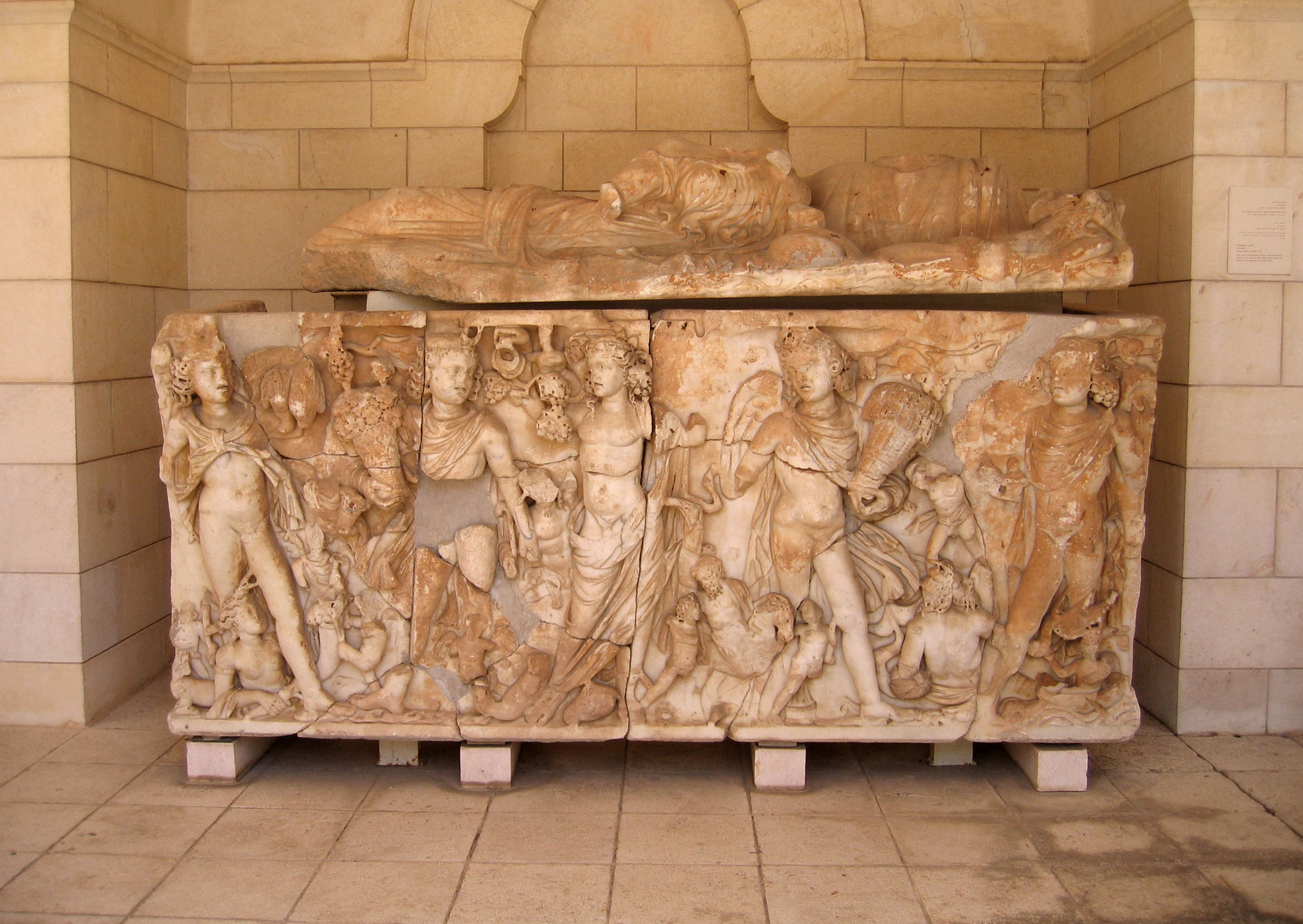
Roman sarcophagus, 3rd century, discovered at Turmus Ayya, now at Rockefeller Museum, Jerusalem

Potsherds dating to the late Iron Age around the 8th–7th centuries BCE and later periods have been found in Turmus Ayya. Archaeological surveys have suggested that settlement at the site continued from that period onwards.

Turmus Ayya is generally identified with Turbasaim in Crusader sources. Northeast of the town is Khirbet Ras ad-Deir, also known as Deir el-Fikia, which has been identified with the Crusader village of Dere.

In 1145, half of the income from Turmus Ayya and Dere was assigned to the Abbey of Mount Tabor for maintenance of the church at Sinjil. In 1175, Turmus Ayya, Dere and Sinjil were transferred to the Church of the Holy Sepulchre.

=== Ottoman era ===
Turmus Ayya was incorporated into the Ottoman Empire with the rest of Palestine in 1517. In the 1596 tax registers it appeared in the Nahiya of Quds in the Liwa of Quds. The village had 43 households, all Muslim. Residents paid taxes on wheat, barley, olive trees, vineyards, fruit trees, goats, and beehives, amounting to 7,200 akçe. Eleven twenty-fourths of the revenue went to a Waqf.

In 1838, Edward Robinson placed Turmus Aya in the province of Jerusalem, close to the boundary with the province of Nablus. He described it as being on a low rocky mound in a level valley.

Several graves in the town's cemetery have headstones dating to the Ottoman period.

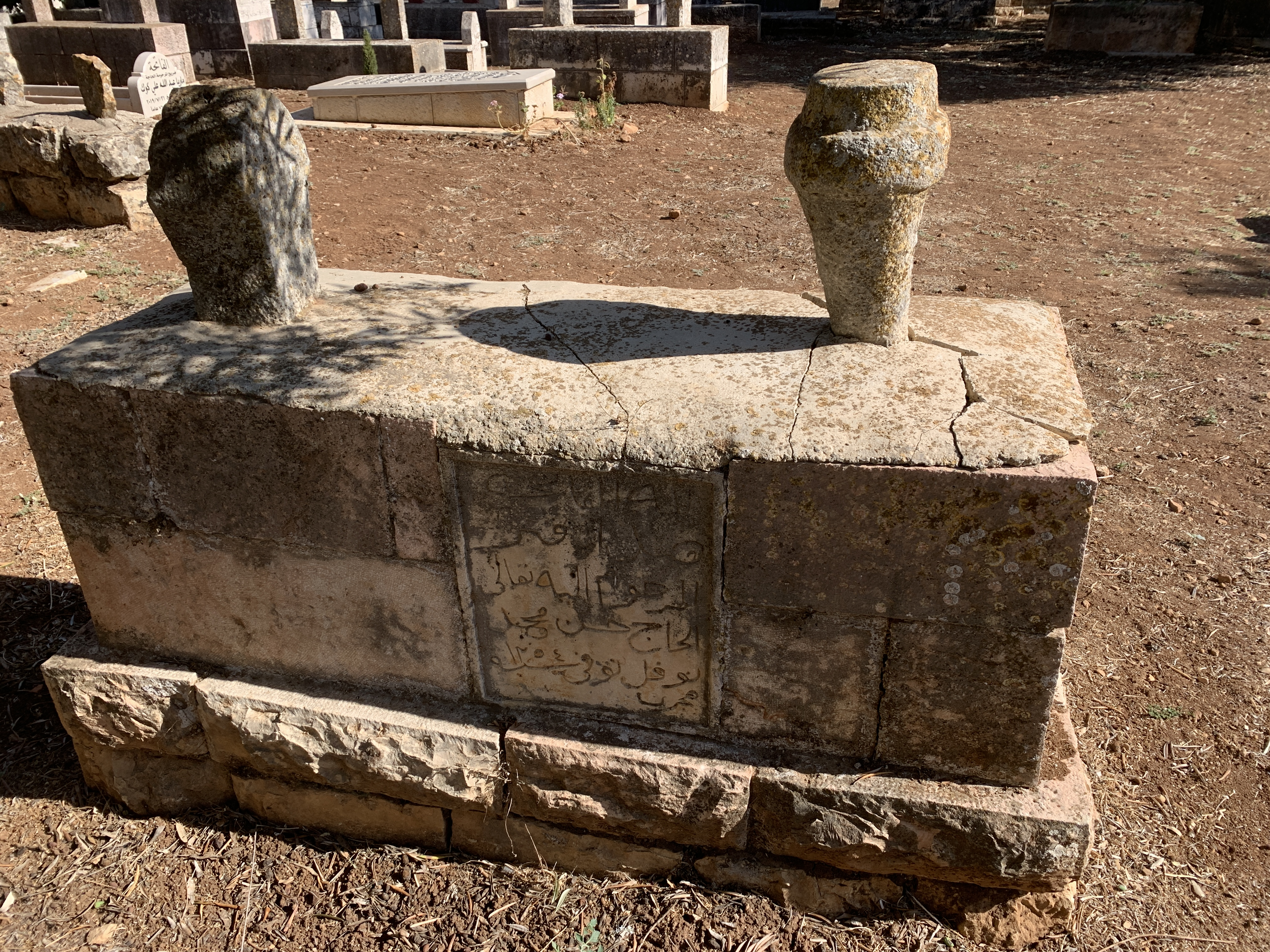
Grave dated to 1838

French explorer Victor Guérin visited Turmus Ayya in 1870. He recorded ancient cisterns, a broken lintel decorated with a garland, and fragments of a column. Guérin estimated the population at about 700. He wrote that the village was administered by two sheikhs and that water was brought from nearby springs because its cisterns were almost dry.

An Ottoman village list from around 1870 recorded 88 houses and 301 male residents. Hartmann later recorded 82 houses.

In 1882, the Palestine Exploration Fund's Survey of Western Palestine described Turmus Ayya as a moderately sized village on a low knoll in a fertile plain, with a spring to the south and fruit trees around it. In 1896, its population was estimated at about 834.

=== British Mandate era ===
In the 1922 census of Palestine, conducted by the British Mandate authorities, Turmus Ayya had 707 residents, all Muslim.

The 1931 census of Palestine recorded 185 occupied houses and a population of 717, including 716 Muslims and one Christian woman.

In the 1945 village statistics, Turmus Ayya had a population of 960, all Muslim, and a total land area of 17,611 dunams. Of this land, 3,665 dunams were plantations or irrigable land, 7,357 were used for cereals and 54 dunams were classified as built-up area.

=== Jordanian era ===
After the 1948 Arab–Israeli War and the 1949 Armistice Agreements, Turmus Ayya came under Jordanian rule. Jordan annexed the West Bank in 1950.

The Jordanian census of 1961 recorded 1,620 residents.

=== 1967–present ===
Since the Six-Day War in 1967, Turmus Ayya has been under Israeli occupation. An Israeli census that year recorded 1,562 residents. By 1989, the population had risen to 5,140.

Under the Oslo II Accord of 1995, 64.7% of the town's land was classified as Area B and 35.3% as Area C. ARIJ reports that 752 dunams of village land were taken for the Israeli settlement of Shilo and another 372 dunams for Mizpe Rahel.

In December 2014, Palestinian official Ziad Abu Ein died during a protest near Turmus Ayya against Israeli occupation and land confiscation.

==== Settler violence ====
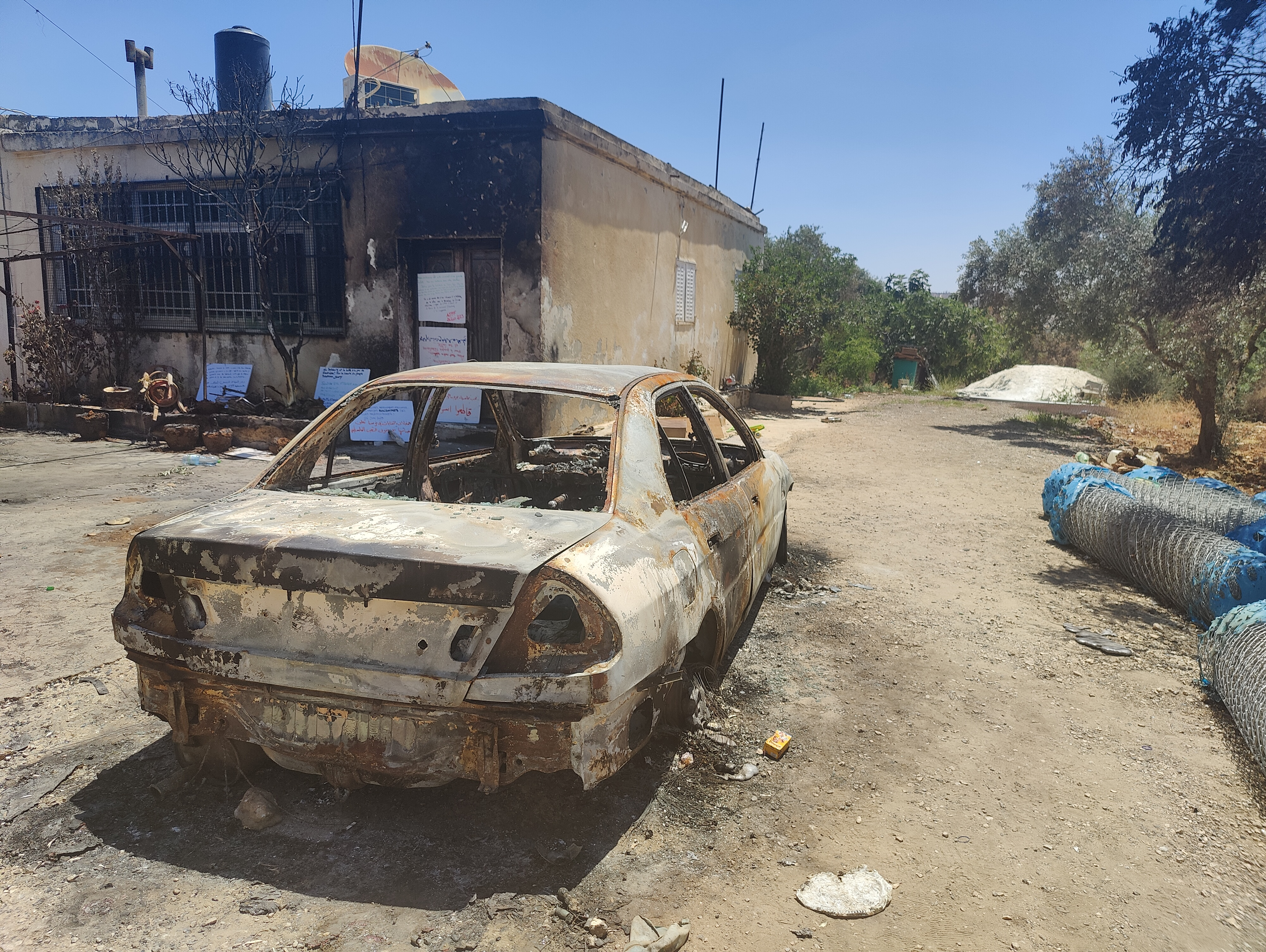
Burned house and car following an attack by Israeli settlers in Turmus Ayya, June 2023

B'Tselem recorded ten attacks by Israeli settlers in or around Turmus Ayya during the first six months of 2023.

On 21 June 2023, hundreds of masked Israeli settlers entered Turmus Ayya after four Israelis were killed in a shooting near the settlement of Eli. None of Turmus Ayya's residents had any apparent connection to the earlier shooting. About 30 Palestinian houses and 60 vehicles were set on fire during the attack. The attacks lasted two hour and resulted in millions of shekels of damages Omar Qattin, a 27-year-old resident, was shot dead during the attack.

An Israel Defense Forces spokesperson described the settler attacks as acts of terror by criminals. In the following weeks, five suspects in settler riots were placed in Israeli administrative detention.

Fields near Turmus Ayya burning in July 2024

In July 2024, the United Nations Office for the Coordination of Humanitarian Affairs reported four consecutive days in which settlers burned farmhouses and agricultural generators around Turmus Ayya.

On 4 April 2025, Israeli forces shot and killed 14-year-old Palestinian-American Amer Mohammed Rabea near Turmus Ayya and wounded two other teenagers. The IDF claimed the three had thrown rocks at a road and described them as terrorists. It released thermal footage of the shooting and said Unit 636 had killed one and hit two others.

Later that month, settlers began establishing an unauthorized outpost near Turmus Ayya, throwing rocks, firing live rounds, and decending upon the inhabitants living on the outskirts. Footage published by the Israeli organization Yesh Din showed construction equipment and mobile homes being moved into the area while Israeli soldiers were present. The Times of Israel reported that the Israeli government had not formally authorized a settlement at the site.

On 18 August 2025, masked settlers attacked Palestinian farmland near Turmus Ayya, damaged olive trees and set vegetation on fire. A BBC crew at the scene reported that settlers riding quad bikes chased people attempting to put out fires on the affected land.

On 19 October 2025, settlers attacked Palestinians harvesting olives near Turmus Ayya. Vehicles were burned and several farmers were assaulted. A masked settler struck a 55-year-old woman in the head; she lost consciousness and was hospitalized with a brain hemorrhage. U.S. journalist Jasper Nathaniel filmed part of the attack.

In August 2026, The Guardian reported that another unauthorized Israeli outpost had been established on private farmland owned by people from Turmus Ayya, and settlers had carried out repeated nighttime incursions near the town, throwing rocks and firing live rounds. Residents interviewed by the newspaper described gunfire, threats and attacks on houses, and some had installed shutters, fences or barbed wire around their properties.

Yaser Alkam, the head of the village council, told The Guardian that he regularly contacted the U.S. embassy during attacks. He said embassy officials had intervened in late July 2026 after Israeli soldiers occupied a house belonging to a U.S. citizen from Syracuse, New York. The U.S. State Department told the newspaper that U.S. citizens in the West Bank had access to consular services and said it condemned violence by any party.

== Infrastructure ==
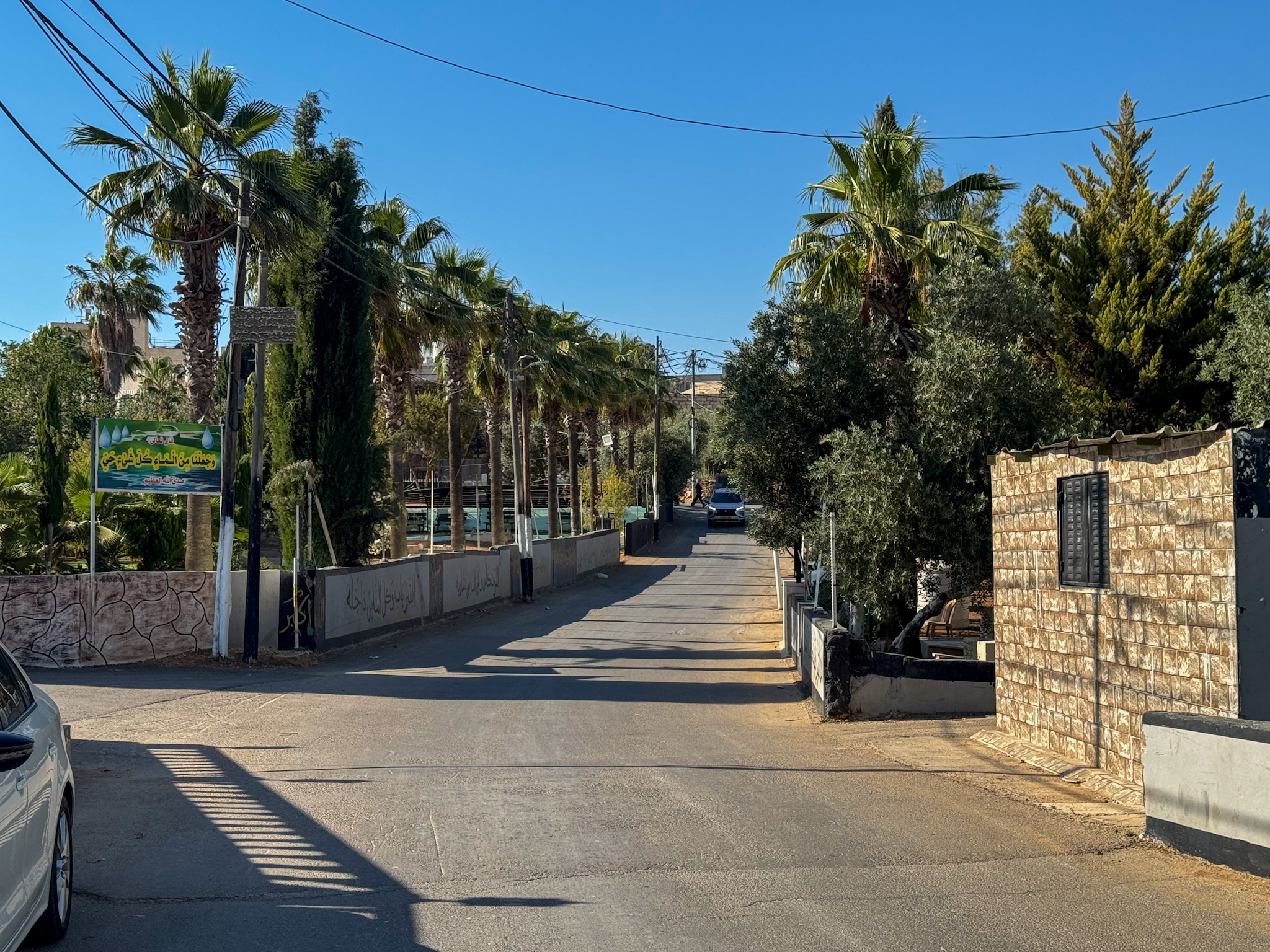
Al Ein Street in Turmus Ayya

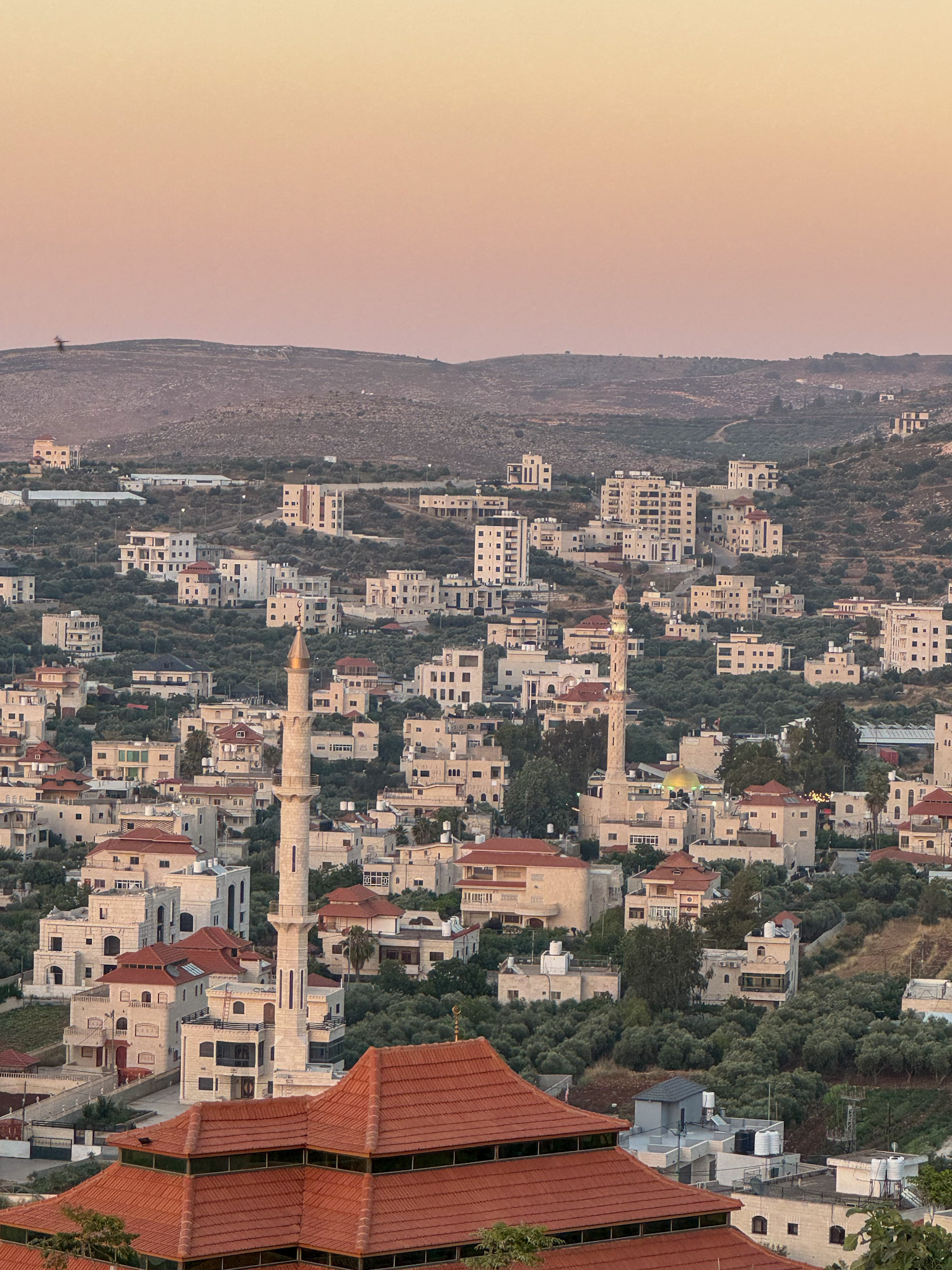
Two mosques in eastern Turmus Ayya

=== Healthcare ===
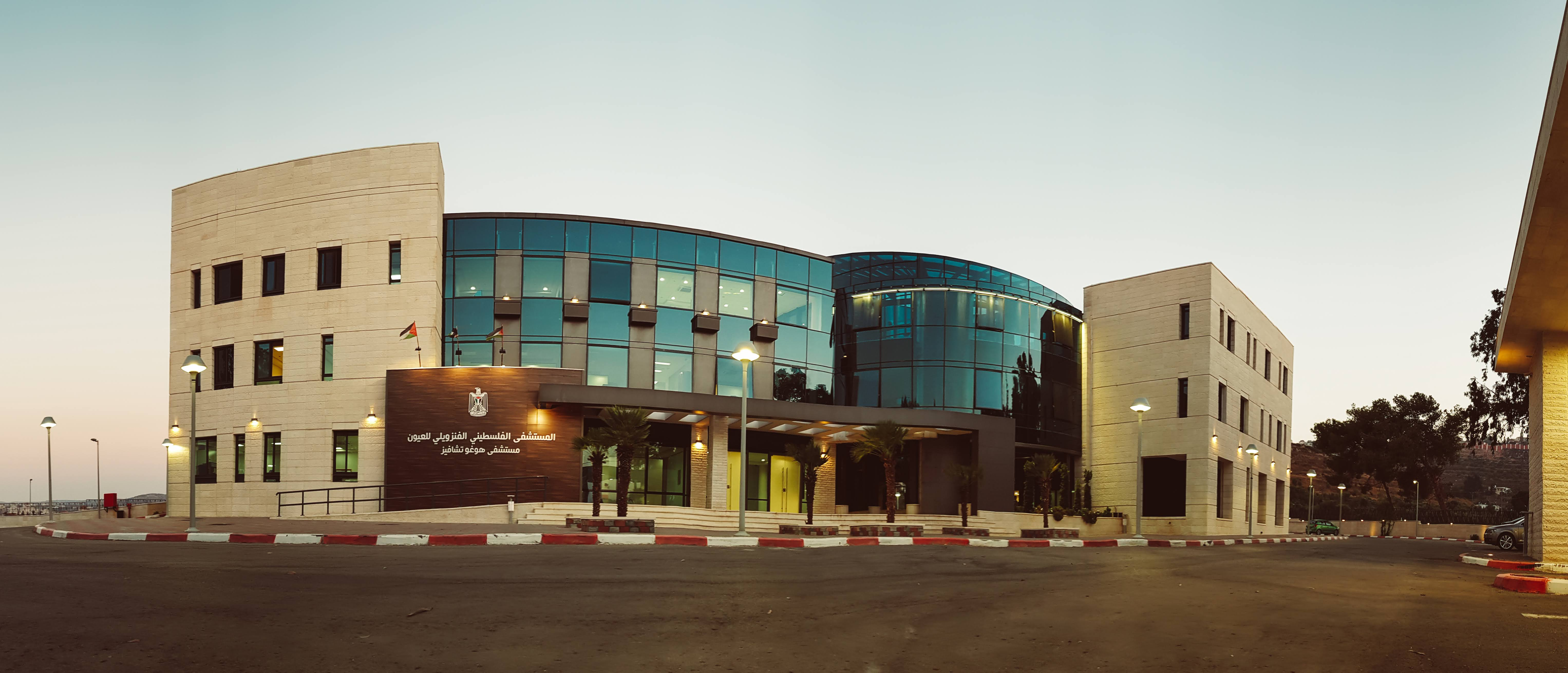
The Hugo Chavez Ophthalmic Hospital in Turmus Ayya

In 2018, the Hugo Chavez Ophthalmic Hospital opened in Turmus Ayya. It was the first Palestinian government hospital specializing in eye care.

The hospital has four floors and an area of around 7,300 square metres. Its facilities include outpatient clinics, an emergency room, operating rooms, a cornea bank, administrative offices, and accommodation for medical staff. An adjacent building hossts lecture halls and meeting rooms, a cafeteria, and other support facilities. The complex also has an on-site wastewater treatment system.

During the COVID-19 pandemic, the hospital was temporarily converted into a treatment and isolation center for patients from the Ramallah district.

== Economy ==
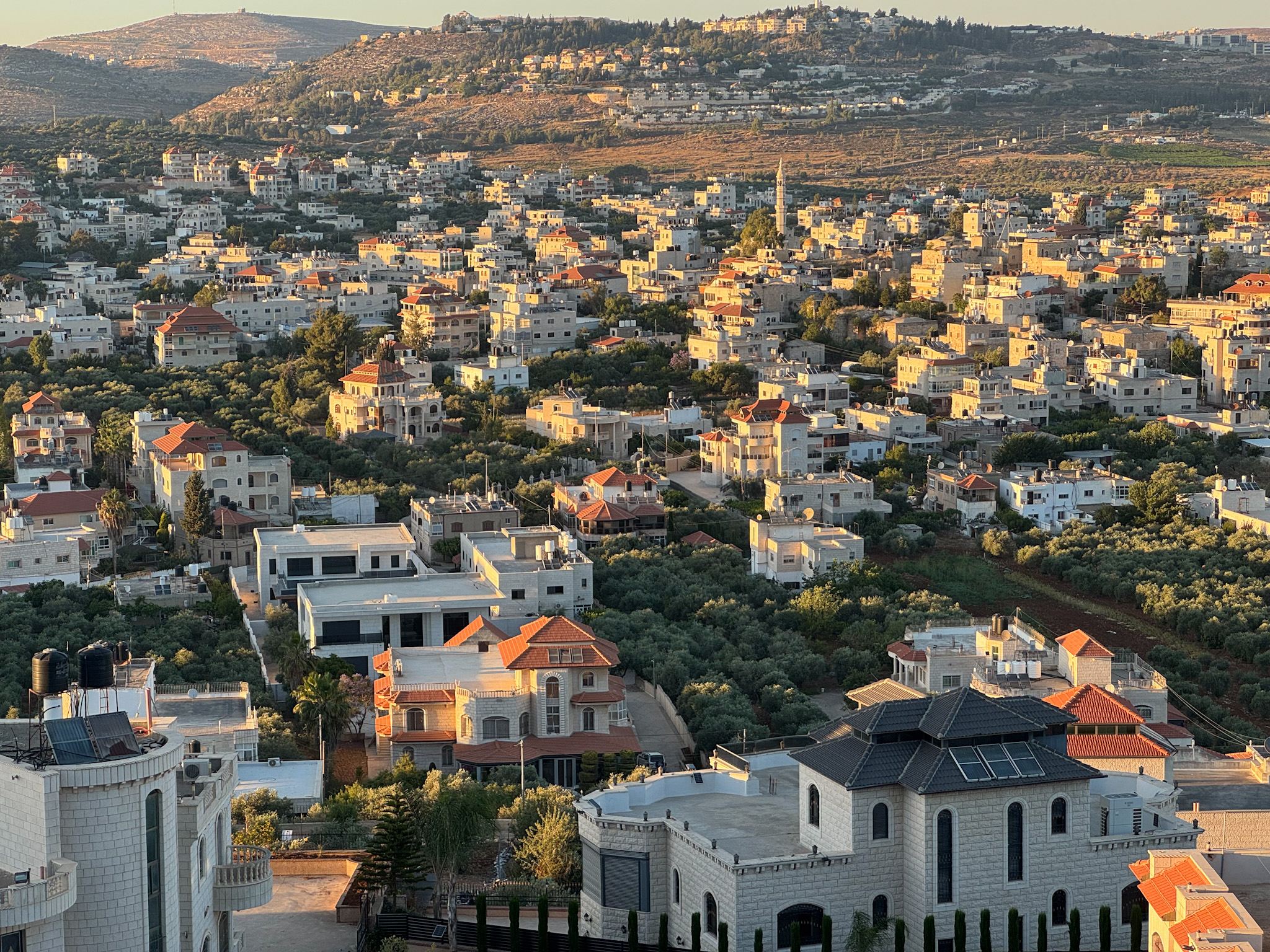
Residential view of Turmus Ayya

Turmus Ayya's economy has heavy ties to the United States.

Many families from Turmus Ayya emigrated during the 1960s and 1970 to the United States and Panama. Most established businesses abroad and later returned to the town and maintained vacation homes there. Others established remote business and moved back to the town permanently, often building large houses. Money earned abroad finances the construction of these luxury homes, which led to a continued boom in local construction and tile-based businesses. Ynetnews reported in 2023 that local residents sometimes refer to Turmus Ayya as the "eastern suburb of Washington, D.C." because of its large Palestinian-American population.

Reports by Le Monde detail large investments by diaspora families into town infrastructure and other projects in Turmus Ayya beyond homes. Agricultural infrastructure and automations funded by the diaspora consists most of the local economy. An AFP report published by The Times of Israel features businessman Jamal Zaglul, a Palestinian-American who returned to Turmus Ayya to operate an olive press in the town. This also attracts labour from surrounding villages as agricultural workers work on land belonging to Turmus Ayya residents.

Beyond agriculture, there are recent developments that diversify the economy. One such project includes the Turmus Aya Equestrian Club, which was founded in 2007 by Ashraf Rabi. His family had emigrated to Panama and the United States in the 1980s before returning to Turmus Ayya in the early 2000s. The club includes riding and equestrian facilities for breeds of rare Arabian horses, and attracts horse traders from all over the Middle East

== Bibliography ==
- Barron, J.B., ed. (1923). Palestine: Report and General Abstracts of the Census of 1922. Government of Palestine.
- Conder, C.R.; Kitchener, H.H. (1882). The Survey of Western Palestine: Memoirs of the Topography, Orography, Hydrography, and Archaeology. Vol. 2. London: Committee of the Palestine Exploration Fund.
- Finkelstein, I.; Lederman, Zvi, eds. (1997). Highlands of Many Cultures. Tel Aviv: Institute of Archaeology of Tel Aviv University Publications Section. ISBN 978-965-440-007-7.
- Government of Jordan, Department of Statistics (1964). First Census of Population and Housing. Volume I: Final Tables; General Characteristics of the Population (PDF).
- Government of Palestine, Department of Statistics (1945). Village Statistics, April, 1945.
- Guérin, V. (1869). Description Géographique Historique et Archéologique de la Palestine (in French). Vol. 1: Judee, pt. 2. Paris: L'Imprimerie Nationale.
- Hadawi, S. (1970). Village Statistics of 1945: A Classification of Land and Area ownership in Palestine. Palestine Liberation Organization Research Center.
- Hartmann, M. (1883). "Die Ortschaftenliste des Liwa Jerusalem in dem türkischen Staatskalender für Syrien auf das Jahr 1288 der Flucht (1871)". Zeitschrift des Deutschen Palästina-Vereins. 6: 102–149.
- Hütteroth, W.-D.; Abdulfattah, K. (1977). Historical Geography of Palestine, Transjordan and Southern Syria in the Late 16th Century. Erlanger Geographische Arbeiten, Sonderband 5. ISBN 978-3-920405-41-4.
- Michon, E. (1913). "Sarcophage representant Bacchus et les Genies des saisons decouvert a Tourmous'aya". Revue Biblique. 10 (1): 111–118. JSTOR 44101421.
- Mills, E., ed. (1932). Census of Palestine 1931. Population of Villages, Towns and Administrative Areas. Jerusalem: Government of Palestine.
- Neubauer, A. (1868). La géographie du Talmud : mémoire couronné par l'Académie des inscriptions et belles-lettres (in French). Paris: Lévy.
- Palmer, E.H. (1881). The Survey of Western Palestine: Arabic and English Name Lists Collected During the Survey by Lieutenants Conder and Kitchener, R. E. Transliterated and Explained by E.H. Palmer. Committee of the Palestine Exploration Fund.
- Pringle, D. (1993). The Churches of the Crusader Kingdom of Jerusalem: A-K (excluding Acre and Jerusalem). Vol. I. Cambridge University Press. ISBN 0-521-39036-2.
- Robinson, E.; Smith, E. (1841). Biblical Researches in Palestine, Mount Sinai and Arabia Petraea: A Journal of Travels in the year 1838. Vol. 3. Boston: Crocker & Brewster.
- Röhricht, R. (1887). "Studien zur mittelalterlichen Geographie und Topographie Syriens". Zeitschrift des Deutschen Palästina-Vereins. 10: 195–344.
- Röhricht, R. (1893). (RRH) Regesta regni Hierosolymitani (MXCVII-MCCXCI) (in Latin). Berlin: Libraria Academica Wageriana.
- Saulcy, L.F. de (1854). Narrative of a journey round the Dead Sea, and in the Bible lands, in 1850 and 1851. Vol. 1. London: R. Bentley.
- Savignac, R. (1913). "Decouvertes a Tourmous'aya". Revue Biblique. 10 (1): 106–111. JSTOR 44101420.
- Schick, C. (1896). "Zur Einwohnerzahl des Bezirks Jerusalem". Zeitschrift des Deutschen Palästina-Vereins. 19: 120–127.
- Socin, A. (1879). "Alphabetisches Verzeichniss von Ortschaften des Paschalik Jerusalem". Zeitschrift des Deutschen Palästina-Vereins. 2: 135–163.
