= Khirbet Abu Falah =

Village in the State of Palestine

- Municipality type D (Village council)

Arabic transcription(s)
  - Arabic: خربة ابو فلاح
- Khirbet abu-Falah in 2019

- Location of Khirbet Abu Falah within Palestine
- Coordinates: 32°0′56″N 35°18′5″E
- Palestine grid: 179/157
- State: State of Palestine
- Governorate: Ramallah and al-Bireh

Government
  - Type: Village council
  - Head of Municipality: Masoud D'ais Hasan Abu Morra
- Elevation: 743 m (2,438 ft)

Population (2017)
  - Total: 4,394
- Name meaning: The ruin of the father of agriculture (perhaps fellah, peasant)

Khirbet Abu Falah (Arabic: خربة ابو فلاح, translates to "Ruins of the Farmer's Father") is a Palestinian village in the Ramallah and al-Bireh Governorate, located 26 kilometers (16 mi) north of Ramallah in the central West Bank. According to the Palestinian Central Bureau of Statistics (PCBS), the village had a population of 4,394 in the 2017 census.

== Geography ==
Khirbet Abu Falah is situated in a hilly area in the central highlands of the West Bank and has an average elevation of 743 meters above sea level. It is located 15.7 kilometers northeast of Ramallah. The nearest localities are al-Mazraa al-Sharqiyah to the southwest, Turmus Ayya to the north, al-Mughayyir to the east and Kafr Malik to the south.

== History ==
=== Background: archaeology and other research ===
Potsherds from the Iron Age and Byzantine periods have been found here.

The 1882 Survey of Western Palestine (SWP) mentions ancient remains including cisterns and a water collection pool.

In 1970, Prawer and Benvenisti identified Khirbet Abu-Falah with the Crusader place called Caphrapalos, however, this identification was rejected by Israel Finkelstein.

=== Ottoman period ===
Khirbet Abu Falah was founded after the 16th century, maybe in the 19th century, as a result of the Qays–Yaman war.

Potsherd from the early Ottoman period was found, but Finkelstein finds the identification "questionable."

According to the Applied Research Institute-Jerusalem (ARIJ), the modern village was re–founded in the 18th century. Prior to becoming a permanent settlement, it was khirba, i.e. a temporary settlement. Khirbet Abu Falah became a permanent village when the Jaradat and Shu'man clans moved there from al-Mazraa al-Sharqiya as a result of a dispute with other clans in that village. The village was named after one of its leaders, Abu Falah.

In 1838, Abu Felah was noted as a Muslim village, part of the Beni Salim district, located east of Jerusalem.

An Ottoman village list from about 1870 showed the village, called Chirbet abu-fellah, had a population of 265, with a total of 58 houses, though the population count only included men. It also noted it was located SE of Turmus Ayya.

In 1882, the PEF's Survey of Western Palestine (SWP) described it as: "a small hamlet on high ground, with ruins." They further noted, that it: "appears to be an ancient site; cisterns and an ancient birkeh, partly of good-sized masonry and partly cut in rock, exist here, with foundations. The place is still inhabited."

In 1896 the population of Chirbet abu felah was estimated to be about 816 people.

=== British Mandate ===
In the 1922 census of Palestine conducted by the British Mandate authorities, the village had a population of 519, all Muslims, increasing slightly in the 1931 census where Khirbet Abu Falah had a population of 588, in 125 houses.

In the 1945 statistics the population was 710, all Muslims, while the total land area was 8,186 dunams, according to an official land and population survey. Of this, 3,080 were allocated for plantations and irrigable land, 1,615 for cereals, while 19 dunams were classified as built-up (urban) areas.

=== Jordanian period ===
In the wake of the 1948 Arab–Israeli War, and after the 1949 Armistice Agreements, Khirbet Abu Falah came under Jordanian rule.

The Jordanian census of 1961 found 1,057 inhabitants.

=== 1967-present ===
Since the Six-Day War in 1967, Khirbet Abu Falah has been under Israeli occupation.

After the 1995 accords, 99.7% of village land was classified as Area B, the remaining 0.3% as Area C.

In 1998, a village council was established to administer Khirbet Abu Falah's civil affair. The council has nine members appointed by the Palestinian National Authority. The council is also included in the Joint Services Council, which is a cooperative board that also includes the villages of al-Mazraa al-Sharqiya, Kafr Malik and al-Mughayyir.

== Demographics ==
Khirbet Abu Falah had a population of 2,900 in the 1997 census by the Palestinian Central Bureau of Statistics (PCBS). Palestinian refugees and their descendants accounted for 1.4% of the inhabitants. In the 2007 PCBS census, Khirbet Abu Falah's population grew to 3,966. The number of households was 620, with each household containing an average of between six and seven members. Women made up 49% of the population and men 51%.

The population is Muslim and there are three mosques in the village: the Old Mosque, the Eastern Mosque, and the Abu Ubeidah Mosque. The principal clans of Khirbet Abu Falah are Abu Murrah, Abu Falah, Al Fuqaha', Nazel, As Saraseer and Abu Hayyah. Since 2000, five families have emigrated from the village.

== Economy ==
The largest source of employment in Khirbet Abu Falah is the services sector, which accounts for about 50% of the village's labor force. Other major sectors are government or professional employment (20%), agriculture (17%) and trade (10%). Industry, which accounts for 3% of Khirbet Abu Falah's labor, largely revolves around the local stone masonry industry. There are three quarries, 30 grocery stores, two produce stores, three butcheries and three professional workshops in the village. In 2011, the unemployment rate in Khirbet Abu Falah was 20%.

The village has a total area of 8,245 dunams. Built-up areas make up 8.4% of the village's land, while cultivable areas and open spaces constitute 56.4% and 35.1%, respectively. Of the cultivable areas, 3,981 dunams are planted with permanent crops, mainly olive trees and grains. About 5% of Khirbet Abu Falah's residents raise livestock and together own 835 sheep and 549 goats.

== Bibliography ==
- Amiry, S. (1987). Space, Kinship and Gender: The Social Dimension of Peasant Architecture in Palestine. University of Edinburgh-Faculty of Social Sciences. hdl:1842/6987.
- Barron, J.B., ed. (1923). Palestine: Report and General Abstracts of the Census of 1922. Government of Palestine.
- Conder, C.R.; Kitchener, H.H. (1882). The Survey of Western Palestine: Memoirs of the Topography, Orography, Hydrography, and Archaeology. Vol. 2. London: Committee of the Palestine Exploration Fund.
- Finkelstein, I.; Lederman, Zvi, eds. (1997). Highlands of many cultures. Tel Aviv: Institute of Archaeology of Tel Aviv University Publications Section. ISBN 965-440-007-3.
- Government of Jordan, Department of Statistics (1964). First Census of Population and Housing. Volume I: Final Tables; General Characteristics of the Population (PDF).
- Government of Palestine, Department of Statistics (1945). Village Statistics, April, 1945.
- Hadawi, S. (1970). Village Statistics of 1945: A Classification of Land and Area ownership in Palestine. Palestine Liberation Organization Research Center. Archived from the original on 2018-12-08.
- Hartmann, M. (1883). "Die Ortschaftenliste des Liwa Jerusalem in dem türkischen Staatskalender für Syrien auf das Jahr 1288 der Flucht (1871)". Zeitschrift des Deutschen Palästina-Vereins. 6: 102–149.
- Mills, E., ed. (1932). Census of Palestine 1931. Population of Villages, Towns and Administrative Areas. Jerusalem: Government of Palestine.
- Palmer, E.H. (1881). The Survey of Western Palestine: Arabic and English Name Lists Collected During the Survey by Lieutenants Conder and Kitchener, R. E. Transliterated and Explained by E.H. Palmer. Committee of the Palestine Exploration Fund.
- Prawer, J.; Benvenisti, D. (1970). Palestine under the Crusaders. In: Amiran, D.H.K. et al., eds. Atlas of Israel. Vol. IX: 10. Jerusalem.
- Robinson, E.; Smith, E. (1841). Biblical Researches in Palestine, Mount Sinai and Arabia Petraea: A Journal of Travels in the year 1838. Vol. 3. Boston: Crocker & Brewster.
- Schick, C. (1896). "Zur Einwohnerzahl des Bezirks Jerusalem". Zeitschrift des Deutschen Palästina-Vereins. 19: 120–127.
- Socin, A. (1879). "Alphabetisches Verzeichniss von Ortschaften des Paschalik Jerusalem". Zeitschrift des Deutschen Palästina-Vereins. 2: 135–163.
