= 1935–36 Palestine League =

Palestine League
- Season: 1935–36
- Champions: Maccabi Tel Aviv
- Matches: 30
- Goals: 93 (3.1 per match)

The 1935–36 Palestine League was the fourth season of league football in the British Mandate for Palestine. It began on 7 December 1935 and ended on 18 December 1936. The defending champions were Hapoel Tel Aviv.

Due to the 1936–1939 Arab revolt only six teams took part in the league, and the league schedule was inconsistent. The championship was won by Maccabi Tel Aviv.

== League table ==
Pos	Team	Pld	W	D	L	GF	GA	GR	Pts		MTA	HKT	HTA	HHA	MPT	MNZ
1	Maccabi Tel Aviv	10	7	2	1	21	9	2.333	16	Champions	—	2–2	0–0	2–1	1–0	5–0
2	Hakoah Tel Aviv	10	6	3	1	18	8	2.250	15		3–1	—	1–2	1–0	2–1	2–1
3	Hapoel Tel Aviv	10	4	4	2	24	12	2.000	12		2–3	0–0	—	2–2	1–1	7–1
4	Hapoel Haifa	10	4	2	4	16	13	1.231	10		0–3	0–3 (Note: The match was abandoned with Hapoel Haifa leading 3–1.)	4–1	—	4–0	3–0 (Note: The match was abandoned with the score 2–2.)
5	Maccabi Petah Tikva	10	2	3	5	10	20	0.500	7		1–3	1–1	0–7	1–1	—	3–0
6	Maccabi Nes Tziona	10	0	0	10	2	29	0.069	0		0–1	0–3	0–2	0–1	0–2	—

Updated to match(es) played on 19 December 1936. Source: IFA, The Palestine Post
