= Arab Palestine Sports Federation =

The Arab Palestine Sport Federation (APSF; Arabic: الإتحاد الرياضي العربي الفلسطيني, al-Ittihad al-Riadi al-'Arabi al-Filastini) was a governing body of sport activities for Palestinian Arabs in Mandatory Palestine. The federation was active between 1931 and 1937 and between 1944 and 1948. It organized a variant of activities in various sports, mostly in football, boxing, and weightlifting.

== History ==
Sporting events among the Arab populace of Ottoman Palestine started at the beginning of the 20th century. The first Arab football club, St. George School, was established in 1908, and in 1911 a social athletic club, Circle Sportive (al-Muntada al-Riyadi) was established in Jerusalem's Old City, which organized several events, including a 1,800 meter street race in Jerusalem. After World War I, further clubs were established in Jerusalem, Jaffa, Gaza and Haifa, as well as in Arab villages throughout the country, numbering at about 20 around 1930

In 1928, the Palestine Football Federation was established. This governing body was initiated by the Jewish clubs, and later turned into the Israel Football Association. The dominance of the Jewish clubs in the PFA, and the disenfranchisement of the Arab clubs led the Arab clubs to establish their own organization. In March 1931 a national Arab-Palestinian football team was organized to meet a visiting team from American University of Beirut, and three months later, at a meeting held in Jaffa, the Arab Palestine Sports Federation was established.

In the following years, and until the 1936 revolt, the APSF organized several football tournaments along with the Youth Congress Party, and in 1935 the federation organized a sports festival in Jaffa, in which more than 5,000 athletes competed in track and field events, sword fighting and horseback riding. The existence of the APSF encouraged sport activities among the Arab populace, and led to the establishment of several Arab football clubs. However, due to the revolt, the APSF ceased its activities in late 1937.

After the dissolution of the APSF, Arab teams and athletes were forced to arrange activities by themselves. Some football clubs re-joined the Jewish-controlled PFA competitions. However, after a controversial decision which eliminated Shabab al-Arab from the 1942 Palestine Cup competition, Arab clubs once again quit the PFA. In December 1942 a football association was established in Jaffa, and a similar association was formed in Haifa in November 1943. In a meeting in September 1944 in Jaffa, the APSF was re-established.

The reborn APSF was divided into six regions – Jerusalem, Jaffa, Nablus, Gaza, Galilee and Haifa. By the start of 1945, the APSF had 25 member clubs. The federation arranged a national football league, and a national Arab-Palestinian football team, and tried to set competitions between the national team and nearby national teams. However, as the federation was not affiliated to FIFA, as the Jewish PFA was, such arrangements were proved difficult. In 1946, supported by the Lebanese Football Federation and the Egyptian Football Association, the APSF applied for membership in FIFA, however, the bid was rejected due to the existence of PFA, and the lack of willing to accept another member for the same territory.

The federation also arranged track and field meets in 1946 and 1947, including a sports exhibition in Jaffa, where several events, including running events (sprints, middle-distance running and relay races), jumping events (long jump, triple jump, high jump and pole vault) and throwing events (shot put, javelin and discus). cycling, weightlifting, wrestling, and boxing events were also organized by the ASPF during these times.

By 1948, the APSF membership had risen to 55 clubs, but as the 1948 Arab–Israeli War progressed, and as the state of Israel was established on 56% of the territory of Mandatory Palestine, with the West Bank taken by Jordan and the Gaza Strip taken by Egypt, the APSF was disestablished.

== Palestine Premier League ==
Under the APSF, a national football league was established in 1945. The competition was divided to six regional leagues, which included a top division and lower divisions. The divisions' champions played a play-off competition to set the champions.

=== League play-off winners ===
- 1945 Palestine Premier League: Islamic Sport Club Jaffa
- 1946 Palestine Premier League: Shabab al-Arab Haifa
- 1947 Palestine Premier League: Shabab al-Arab Haifa

== See also ==
- Sport in Palestine
- Football in Palestine
