= 1954–55 Hapoel Balfouria F.C. season =

Hapoel Balfouria
1954–55 season
- Stadium: Hapoel Ground, Afula
- Liga Alef: not completed
- State Cup: Intermediate Round
- Top goalscorer: League: Reuven Tal (5); All: Reuven Tal (6)

The 1954–55 Hapoel Balfouria season was the club's 13th season since its establishment, in 1906, and 7th since the establishment of the State of Israel. This was the club's second and last season in the top division.

During the season, the club competed in Liga Alef (top division) and the State Cup.

== Review and events ==
- Before the beginning of the season, the club merged with Hapoel Afula. The club kept the name Hapoel Balfouria, although it was also called Hapoel Balfouria/Afula.
- As the club finished bottom at the end of the previous season, the club was initially placed in Liga Bet, and started the season in this division on 8 January 1955. However, as the IFA reprieved the club from relegation as part of the settlement reached to eliminate the dispute that interrupted IFA activities, the club was returned to Liga Alef, and began the season anew in Liga Alef on 5 February 1955.

== Match Results ==
=== Legend ===
Win Draw Loss

=== Liga Alef ===
League matches began on 6 February 1955, and by the time the season, only 20 rounds of matches were completed, delaying the end of the league season to the next season.

==== League table (as of 2 July 1955) ====
Pos	Club	P	W	D	L	GF	GA	GR	Pts
10	Hapoel Haifa	20	6	6	8	31	35	0.89	18
11	Hapoel Ramat Gan	20	7	3	10	23	27	0.85	17
12	Beitar Jerusalem	20	5	5	10	27	47	0.57	15
13	Hapoel Hadera	20	6	2	12	24	37	0.65	14
14	Hapoel Balfouria	20	2	2	16	23	92	0.25	6

==== Matches ====
===== Liga Bet =====
9 January 1955 1	Hapoel Nahariya	3–1	Hapoel Balfouria	Nahariya
		Report (p. 8)		Attendance: 1,000; Referee: Sher

22 January 1955 1	Hapoel Balfouria	1–1	Hapoel Ra'anana	Afula
				Stadium: Hapoel Ground

29 January 1955 1	Hapoel Beit Lid	2–1	Hapoel Balfouria	Netanya
	Machluf 22'; Sasson 88'	Report (p. 8)	48' Zussmann	Stadium: Hapoel Ground; Attendance: 700; Referee: Grauber

===== Liga Alef =====
5 February 1955 1	Maccabi Rehovot	6–1	Hapoel Balfouria	Rehovot
	Litvak 18', 65'; Vider 70', 78'; Shrager 80', 82'	Report (p. 8)	47' Tal	Stadium: Maccabi Ground; Attendance: 600; Referee: Rosenbaum

12 February 1955 2	Hapoel Balfouria	0–2	Hapoel Tel Aviv	Afula
		Report	21', 62' Rosenbaum	Stadium: Hapoel Ground

19 February 1955 3	Maccabi Petah Tikva	2–1	Hapoel Balfouria	Petah Tikva
	Carmeli 9'; Scharf 58'		25' Tzur	Stadium: Maccabi Ground

26 February 1955 4	Hapoel Balfouria	4–4	Hapoel Kfar Saba	Afula
	Gordon 6' (pen.); Levin 14'; Kochavi 47'; Tal 68'	Report (p. 8)	62', 76' Meirman; 65' (pen.), 81' Schmilovich	Stadium: Hapoel Ground; Attendance: 1,000; Referee: Sher

5 March 1955 5	Hapoel Ramat Gan	6–0	Hapoel Balfouria	Givatayim
	Chechik 13', 70'; Kurik 41'; Menasherov 46', 76'; Pulaver 75'	Report (p. 8)		Stadium: HaMakhtesh Stadium; Attendance: 1,800; Referee: Stern

12 March 1955 6	Hapoel Balfouria	2–4	Maccabi Netanya	Afula
	Kohavi 59'; Kushnir 84'		17' M. Cohen; 29', 68' Orenstein; 38' H. Meller	Stadium: Hapoel Ground

19 March 1955 7	Maccabi Tel Aviv	12–0	Hapoel Balfouria	Tel Aviv
	Schneor 4', 19', 53', 71', 76', 80'; Glazer 12', 23'; Studinski 18'; Israeli 38', 39', 65'			Stadium: Basa Stadium

2 April 1955 8	Beitar Tel Aviv	6–1	Hapoel Balfouria	Tel Aviv
	Huli 8', 21', 24'; Elmaliah 55', 57', 90'		89' Gordon	Stadium: Basa Stadium

7 April 1955 9	Maccabi Haifa	1–1	Hapoel Balfouria	Haifa
	Eichenboim 17' (o.g.)	Report	83' Tal	Stadium: Kiryat Haim Stadium; Attendance: 3,000; Referee: Halperin

13 April 1955 10	Hapoel Balfouria	1–5	Hapoel Petah Tikva	Afula
	Tal 74'	Report (p. 4)	13' Haldi; 56' Chirik; 60' Kofman; 73', 76' Stelmach	Stadium: Hapoel Ground; Attendance: 800; Referee: Harap

16 April 1955 11	Hapoel Balfouria	3–1	Hapoel Hadera	Afula
	Tal 15'; Kochavi 24'; Kushnir 66'	Report (p. 8)	57' Salomon	Stadium: Hapoel Ground; Attendance: 1,200; Referee: Markovich

23 April 1955 12	Beitar Jerusalem	6–1	Hapoel Balfouria	Jerusalem
	Yehezkel 20', 49', 53', 65', 68'; Zion 54'	Report (p. 8)	Kochavi 90'	Stadium: YMCA Stadium; Attendance: 5,000; Referee: Asa

30 April 1955 13	Hapoel Balfouria	2–1	Hapoel Haifa	Afula
	Tal 47'; Yeshu'a 86'	Report (p. 8)	74' Schneid	Stadium: Hapoel Ground; Attendance: 1,000

14 May 1955 14	Hapoel Balfouria	0–1	Maccabi Rehovot	Afula
			57' Schmilovich	Stadium: Hapoel Ground; Attendance: 1,000; Referee: Scheindling

21 May 1955 15	Hapoel Tel Aviv	8–1	Hapoel Balfouria	Tel Aviv
	Rosenbaum 5', 35', 54', 76'; Weiss 42', 43', 45'; Alaluf 77'	Report (p. 8)	46' Dubnov	Stadium: Basa Stadium; Attendance: 3,000; Referee: Stern

4 June 1955 16	Hapoel Balfouria	0–3	Maccabi Petah Tikva	Afula
		Report (p. 8)	14' Levkovich; 23' Schneidmesser; 40' Bernard	Stadium: Hapoel Ground; Attendance: 500; Referee: Cohen

11 June 1955 17	Hapoel Kfar Saba	6–1	Hapoel Balfouria	Kfar Saba
	Avrutski 1', 70', 78'; Tzahobel 11', 35'; Edelstein 20' (o.g.)	Report (p. 8)	53' Zussmann	Stadium: Hapoel Ground; Attendance: 1000; Referee: Zahavi

18 June 1955 18	Hapoel Balfouria	1–3	Hapoel Ramat Gan	Afula
	Zahavi 47'	Report (p. 8)	17' Radler; 35' Chronsich; 70' Tsalala	Stadium: Hapoel Ground; Attendance: 500; Referee: Sher

26 June 1955 19	Maccabi Netanya	6–1	Hapoel Balfouria	Netanya
	H. Meller 15'; Y. Spiegel 52', 84'; I. Caspi 61' (pen.); M. Cohen 80', 85'	Report (p. 8)	90' Zahavi	Stadium: Sar-Tov Stadium; Attendance: 1,500; Referee: Metzler

3 July 1955 20	Hapoel Balfouria	2–9	Maccabi Tel Aviv	Afula
	Levin 26'; Kochavi 54'	Report (p. 8)	14', 19', 50', 61', 70' (pen.), 75' Glazer; 35' Israeli; 40', 58' Studinski	Stadium: Hapoel Ground; Attendance: 1,000; Referee: Zahavi

==== Results by match ====
Match	1	2	3	4	5	6	7	8	9	10	11	12	13	14	15	16	17	18	19	20
Result	L	L	L	D	L	L	L	L	D	L	W	L	W	L	L	L	L	L	L	L
Position	10	13	14	13	14	14	14	14	14	14	14	14	14	14	14	14	14	14	14	14

Updated to match(es) played on 3 July 1955. Source: 2 Dear Points
W = Win; D = Draw; L = Loss

=== State Cup ===
26 March 1955 Round 3	Hapoel Balfouria	3–1 (a.e.t.)	Hapoel Ra'anana	Afula
	Levi 86'; Tal 111'; Mashiach 117'		44' Nahari	Stadium: Hapoel Ground

10 July 1955 Int. Round	Hapoel Petah Tikva	w/o	Hapoel Balfouria	Petah Tikva
				Stadium: Hapoel Ground
