= 1958–59 in Israeli football =

Football in Israel
- Season: 1958–59

Men's football
- Liga Leumit: Hapoel Petah Tikva
- Liga Alef: Bnei Yehuda
- Liga Bet: Hapoel Tiberias; Hapoel Ramla
- State Cup: Maccabi Tel Aviv
- 10th Anniversary Cup: Hapoel Haifa (Leumit); Hapoel Tiberias (Liga Alef)

The 1958–59 season was the 11th season of competitive football in Israel and the 33rd season under the Israeli Football Association, established in 1928, during the British Mandate.

== Review and Events ==
- Following the abandonment of the previous season's Liga Alef, Bet and Gimel, the IFA council decided to cancel the previous season's leagues and to open the current season without promotion or relegation taking place. The decision was met with discontent at Beitar Jerusalem (who was leading Liga Alef), Hapoel Tiberias and Hapoel Ramla (leaders of the Liga Bet North and South divisions). After deliberations, in December 1958, The FA Judiciary Tribunal ordered the FA to promote Hapoel Tiberias as soon as possible, pending the FA approval, with matches played by the club during the 1958–59 season not counting towards the table. The FA decided to promote Hapoel Tiberias automatically to Liga Alef at the end of the season, counting its whole season as friendly matches.
- In Autumn 1958 the FA held a competition in celebration of the 10th anniversary of Israel. The competition was played in two tiers, Hapoel Haifa winning the competition for Liga Leumit clubs (along with the top 4 clubs from Liga Alef), while Hapoel Tiberias won the competition for Liga Alef and Liga Bet clubs.
- For the first time, the FA decided to establish a fifth tier in its league system. The fifth tier, which was officially called "Additional Liga Gimel", but was known as Liga Dalet, was open for clubs which registered to the FA during the summer and couldn't be added to 1958–59 Liga Gimel.
- In January 1959 the FA decided to expand At the end of the season, Liga Alef (second tier) was expanded from 12 teams to 14 teams and Liga Bet (third tier) was expanded from 24 teams (in two divisions) to 64 teams (in four divisions). This meant that while two teams relegated from Liga Alef, four promoted from Liga Bet (one of which is Hapoel Tiberias, whose place in Liga Alef was guaranteed), and that no clubs were relegated from Liga Bet and 42 club were promoted from Liga Gimel, which included the 12 league leaders from 1957–58 Liga Gimel at the time the season was stopped.
- The national team took a brief tour of Poland in June 1959, playing one international match and one unofficial match. Israel was beaten 2–7 in the international match, which was labelled in Israel as the "Wrocław Shame". The other match, was billed as a match between Łódź and Tel Aviv ended with a 1–1 draw.

== IFA Competitions ==
=== 1958–59 Liga Leumit ===
Pos	Team	Pld	W	D	L	GF	GA	GD	Pts	Qualification or relegation
1	Hapoel Petah Tikva	22	15	3	4	49	18	+31	33	Champions
2	Hapoel Haifa	22	13	5	4	46	23	+23	31	
3	Maccabi Tel Aviv	22	13	4	5	38	19	+19	30	
4	Maccabi Haifa	22	14	1	7	47	24	+23	29	
5	Maccabi Jaffa	22	10	4	8	33	28	+5	24	
6	Maccabi Petah Tikva	22	10	3	9	27	30	−3	23	
7	Hapoel Tel Aviv	22	6	7	9	29	32	−3	19	
8	Hapoel Ramat Gan	22	6	7	9	26	36	−10	19	
9	Maccabi Netanya	22	7	5	10	22	36	−14	19	
10	Hapoel Jerusalem	22	5	6	11	17	32	−15	16	
11	Beitar Tel Aviv	22	2	9	11	20	47	−27	13	
12	Hapoel Kfar Saba	22	3	2	17	21	50	−29	8	Relegated to Liga Alef

Source: rsssf.com

=== 1957–58 Israel State Cup ===
The 1957–58 Israel State Cup started during the previous season, but was carried over the summer break and finished with the final on 30 September 1958, in which Maccabi Tel Aviv defeated Hapoel Haifa 2–0.

30 September 1958

Maccabi Tel Aviv	2–0	Hapoel Haifa
R. Levi 24' (pen.); Y. Glazer 53'

Ramat Gan Stadium
Attendance: 8,000
Referee: Werner

=== 1958–59 Israel State Cup ===
On 6 December 1958 the next season's competition began, and once again carried over to the next season.

=== Israeli 10th Anniversary Cup ===
As part of the 10th anniversary celebrations of Israel, a cup competition was arranged by the Israeli Football Association. The competition, which was divided to two cups, one for 1957–58 Liga Leumit clubs and one for 1957–58 Liga Alef clubs and was played as a straight knock-out tournament, was won by Hapoel Haifa and Hapoel Tiberias.

8 November 1958

Hapoel Jerusalem	0–2	Hapoel Haifa
	Maariv; Davar	Ashkenazi 69', 72'

Basa Stadium, Tel Aviv
Attendance: 12,000
Referee: Dudai
15 November 1958

Hapoel Tiberias	7–1	Hapoel Be'er Sheva
Sidin 31'; Nizri 33', 41', 61'; I. Faraj 63'; M. Faraj 78', 80'	Davar	Saban 26'

Basa Stadium, Tel Aviv
Attendance: 4,000
Referee: Handwerk

== National teams ==
=== National team ===
==== 1958–59 matches ====
Date	Competition	Opponent	Venue	Result	Scorers
21 June 1959	Friendly	Poland	Olympic Stadium, Wrocław	2–7	Goldstein, Stelmach
