= List of Maccabi Netanya F.C. seasons =

This is a list of seasons played by Maccabi Netanya Football Club in Israeli and European football, from 1937–38 (when the club first competed in the league) to the most recent completed season. It details the club's achievements in major competitions, and the top scorers for each season. Top scorers in bold were also the top scorers in the Israeli league that season. Records of minor competitions such as the Lilian Cup are not included due to them being considered of less importance than the State Cup and the Toto Cup.

== History ==
Maccabi Netanya was established in 1934 and was first promoted to the top division ahead of the 1943–44 season. The club stayed at the top division until the end of the 1961–62 season. After returning to the top division two seasons later, the club went on to win 5 championships. In 1994–95 The club finished bottom of Liga Leumit and were relegated to Liga Artzit, returning to the top division in 1998–99. However, the club was relegated again in 2003–04 after finishing second from bottom, though they made an immediate return to the top division after finishing as Liga Leumit runners-up the following season. The club finished as runners-up in the league in 2006–07 and 2007–08, but as the club met financial difficulties, it went into administration and relegated to the second division.

== Seasons ==
| Season | League | | | | | | | | | State Cup | League Cup | International (Asia/Europe) | Top goalscorer (Note: Goals in all competitions (Liga Leumit or Liga Al, State Cup, Toto Cup and European) are counted.) | |
| Season | Division | P | W | D | L | F | A | Pts | Pos | State Cup | League Cup | International (Asia/Europe) | Name | Goals |
|---|---|---|---|---|---|---|---|---|---|---|---|---|---|---|
| 1937–38 | Gimel; South | 9 | 5 | 1 | 3 | 26 | 11 | 1 | 3rd | – | – | – | | |
| 1938–39 | Samaria Lge. | 10 | 4 | 2 | 4 | 12 | 16 | 10 | 3rd | – | – | – | | |
| 1939–40 | Bet Samaria | 18 | 5 | 3 | 10 | 31 | 47 | 13 | 7th | – | – | – | | |
| 1940–41 | – | – | – | – | – | – | – | – | – | R2 | – | – | | |
| 1941–42 | Bet North | 12 | 11 | 0 | 1 | 45 | 4 | 22 | 1st (Note: Maccabi Natanya competed for promotion against South division winners Hapoel Rehovot, winning the first match 3–1, and losing won the return leg 0–2. A deciding match was never played, as the EIFA decided to promote both teams to Liga Alef.) | QF | – | – | | |
| 1942–43 | – | – | – | – | – | – | – | – | – | Round of 16 | – | – | | |
| 1943–44 | Pal. League | 20 | 11 | 5 | 4 | 47 | 38 | 27 | 6th | QF (Note: The 1944 cup competitions began on 5 February 1944 and was completed during the following season, on 13 January 1945.) | – | – | | |
| 1944–45 | Pal. League; Northern | 12 | 3 | 0 | 9 | 21 | 40 | 6 | 7th | QF | – | – | | |
| 1945–46 | – | – | – | – | – | – | – | – | – | R2 | – | – | | |
| 1946–47 | Pal. League | 26 | 9 | 6 | 11 | 47 | 62 | 24 | 9th | R2 | – | – | | |
| 1947–48 | Pal. League (Note: The 1947–48 league was abandoned due to the 1948 Arab–Israeli War.) | 4 | 1 | 0 | 3 | 8 | 13 | 2 | 10th | – | – | – | | |
| 1948–49 | – | – | – | – | – | – | – | – | – | – (Note: The 1949 cup competition was delayed by appeals after the completion of the quarter-finals. After settling the appeals three further matches were played in February 1951, and the competition was abandoned.) | – | – | | |
| 1949–50 | Isr. League | 24 | 7 | 3 | 14 | 43 | 73 | 17 | 9th | – | – | – | | |
| 1950–51 | – | – | – | – | – | – | – | – | – | – | – | – | | |
| 1951–52 | Alef | 22 | 6 | 5 | 11 | 36 | 46 | 17 | 9th | R3 | – | – | | |
| 1952–53 | – | – | – | – | – | – | – | – | – | Final | – | – | | |
| 1953–54 | Alef | 22 | 7 | 5 | 10 | 23 | 36 | 19 | 7th | Final | – | – | | |
| 1954–55 | Alef | 26 | 13 | 7 | 6 | 54 | 43 | 33 | 4th | R4 | – | – | Max Cohen | 14 |
| 1955–56 | Leumit | 22 | 9 | 2 | 11 | 31 | 44 | 20 | 8th | – | – | – | Itzhak Caspi | 20 |
| 1956–57 | Leumit | 18 | 6 | 2 | 10 | 20 | 27 | 14 | 7th | R5 | – | – | | |
| 1957–58 | Leumit | 22 | 5 | 11 | 6 | 21 | 23 | 21 | 4th | R7 | – | – | | |
| 1958–59 | Leumit | 22 | 7 | 5 | 10 | 22 | 36 | 19 | 9th | R6 | QF | – | | |
| 1959–60 | Leumit | 22 | 8 | 3 | 11 | 30 | 47 | 19 | 8th | QF | – | – | | |
| 1960–61 | Leumit | 22 | 6 | 2 | 14 | 19 | 33 | 14 | 10th | QF | – | – | | |
| 1961–62 | Leumit | 22 | 4 | 5 | 13 | 23 | 41 | 13 | 12th | R6 | – | – | | |
| 1962–63 | Alef | 30 | 18 | 3 | 9 | 76 | 28 | 39 | 4th | R4 | – | – | | |
| 1963–64 | Alef North | 26 | 22 | 3 | 1 | 86 | 17 | 47 | 1st | SF | – | – | | |
| 1964–65 | Leumit | 30 | 14 | 3 | 13 | 46 | 56 | 31 | 8th | QF | – | – | | |
| 1965–66 | Leumit | 30 | 13 | 8 | 9 | 49 | 35 | 34 | 4th | R6 | – | – | | |
| 1966–67 | Leumit | 60 | 20 | 20 | 20 | 82 | 68 | 60 | 8th | QF | – | – | | |
| 1967–68 | Leumit | 60 | 20 | 20 | 20 | 82 | 68 | 60 | 8th | SF | – | – | | |
| 1968–69 | Leumit | 30 | 16 | 9 | 5 | 71 | 32 | 41 | 3rd | Round of 16 | Group | – | | |
| 1969–70 | Leumit | 30 | 7 | 14 | 9 | 29 | 30 | 28 | 11th | Final | – | – | | |
| 1970–71 | Leumit | 30 | 20 | 7 | 3 | 44 | 18 | 47 | 1st | Round of 16 | – | – | | |
| 1971–72 | Leumit | 30 | 15 | 7 | 8 | 44 | 29 | 37 | 4th | QF | – | – | | |
| 1972–73 | Leumit | 30 | 8 | 10 | 12 | 28 | 39 | 26 | 13th | Round of 16 | Group | – | | |
| 1973–74 | Leumit | 30 | 13 | 11 | 6 | 32 | 19 | 37 | 1st | Round of 16 | – | – | | |
| 1974–75 | Leumit | 30 | 14 | 9 | 7 | 39 | 29 | 37 | 2nd | QF | – | – | | |
| 1975–76 | Leumit | 34 | 14 | 9 | 11 | 58 | 39 | 37 | 4th | QF | QF | – | | |
| 1976–77 | Leumit | 30 | 12 | 9 | 9 | 40 | 34 | 3 | 5th | SF | – | – | | |
| 1977–78 | Leumit | 26 | 15 | 8 | 3 | 50 | 21 | 38 | 1st | Winners | – | – | | |
| 1978–79 | Leumit | 30 | 12 | 12 | 6 | 47 | 33 | 36 | 3rd | Round of 16 | – | – | | |
| 1979–80 | Leumit | 30 | 19 | 8 | 3 | 53 | 23 | 46 | 1st | R7 | – | – | | |
| 1980–81 | Leumit | 30 | 9 | 12 | 9 | 31 | 30 | 30 | 10th | Round of 16 | – | – | | |
| 1981–82 | Leumit | 30 | 17 | 7 | 6 | 63 | 29 | 41 | 2nd | Round of 16 | – | – | | |
| 1982–83 | Leumit | 30 | 18 | 7 | 5 | 54 | 31 | 61 | 1st | QF | – | – | | |
| 1983–84 | Leumit | 30 | 11 | 9 | 10 | 52 | 49 | 42 | 4th | SF | – | – | | |
| 1984–85 | Leumit | 30 | 9 | 11 | 10 | 53 | 40 | 38 | 8th | Round of 16 | Group | – | | |
| 1985–86 | Leumit | 30 | 11 | 6 | 13 | 34 | 35 | 39 | 9th | Round of 16 | SF | – | | |
| 1986–87 | Leumit | 30 | 12 | 8 | 10 | 30 | 30 | 44 | 7th | QF | Final | – | | |
| 1987–88 | Leumit | 33 | 16 | 12 | 5 | 56 | 35 | 60 | 2nd | SF | SF | – | | |
| 1988–89 | Leumit | 31 | 14 | 10 | 7 | 36 | 33 | 52 | 3rd | Round of 16 | Final | – | | |
| 1989–90 | Leumit | 32 | 9 | 12 | 11 | 31 | 31 | 39 | 7th | Round of 16 | Group | – | | |
| 1990–91 | Leumit | 32 | 10 | 10 | 12 | 41 | 39 | 40 | 4th | QF | Group | – | | |
| 1991–92 | Leumit | 32 | 8 | 11 | 13 | 32 | 46 | 35 | 6th | QF | Group | – | | |
| 1992–93 | Leumit | 33 | 11 | 6 | 16 | 35 | 57 | 39 | 8th | SF | Group | – | | |
| 1993–94 | Leumit | 39 | 13 | 10 | 16 | 64 | 71 | 49 | 6th | Round of 16 | SF | – | | |
| 1994–95 | Leumit | 30 | 7 | 9 | 14 | 33 | 50 | 30 | 16th | SF | Group | – | | |
| 1995–96 | Artzit | 30 | 9 | 12 | 9 | 38 | 28 | 39 | 9th | R8 | Final | – | | |
| 1996–97 | Artzit | 30 | 16 | 7 | 7 | 53 | 35 | 55 | 3rd | R8 | Group | – | | |
| 1997–98 | Artzit | 30 | 11 | 11 | 8 | 43 | 43 | 44 | 5th | 8 | Group | – | | |
| 1998–99 | Artzit | 30 | 18 | 11 | 1 | 54 | 20 | 65 | 1st | R8 | Group | – | | |
| 1999–2000 | Premier | 39 | 9 | 13 | 17 | 37 | 64 | 40 | 11th | QF | QF | – | | |
| 2000–01 | Premier | 38 | 13 | 10 | 15 | 63 | 61 | 49 | 7th | QF | R2 | – | | |
| 2001–02 | Premier | 33 | 11 | 7 | 15 | 41 | 44 | 40 | 7th | R8 | R2 | – | | |
| 2002–03 | Premier | 33 | 15 | 9 | 9 | 47 | 36 | 54 | 4th | R8 | Group | – | | |
| 2003–04 | Premier | 33 | 8 | 7 | 18 | 28 | 52 | 31 | 11th | QF | SF | Intertoto, R1 | | |
| 2004–05 | Leumit | 33 | 14 | 11 | 8 | 44 | 31 | 53 | 2nd | Round of 16 | Winners | – | | |
| 2005–06 | Premier | 33 | 11 | 8 | 14 | 40 | 45 | 41 | 7th | R9 | Group | – | | |
| 2006–07 | Premier | 33 | 15 | 12 | 6 | 37 | 25 | 57 | 2nd | R9 | Group | – | Samed Abdul Awudu | 11 |
| 2007–08 | Premier | 33 | 16 | 10 | 7 | 40 | 24 | 58 | 2nd | SF | QF | UEFA Cup, 2QR | Itay Shechter | 9 |
| 2008–09 | Premier | 33 | 14 | 12 | 7 | 40 | 32 | 54 | 4th | SF | QF | UEFA Cup, 2QR | Dedi Ben Dayan | 9 |
| 2009–10 | Premier | 33 | 10 | 9 | 14 | 44 | 47 | 21 (Note: Maccabi Netanya scored 36 points in the regular season, which were halved at the beginning of the play-offs. The club scored 3 more points during the play-offs for a total of 39 points.) | 10th | R8 | Group | EL, 3QR | Ahmad Saba'a | 11 |
| 2010–11 | Premier | 35 | 12 | 13 | 10 | 47 | 47 | 27 (Note: Maccabi Netanya scored 44 points in the regular season, which were halved at the beginning of the play-offs. The club scored 5 more points during the play-offs for a total of 49 points.) | 6th | SF | QF | – | Ahmad Saba'a | 17 |
| 2011–12 | Premier | 37 | 17 | 8 | 12 | 54 | 48 | 58 | 4th | QF | Group | – | Ahmad Saba'a | 22 |
| 2012–13 | Premier | 33 | 8 | 11 | 14 | 37 | 47 | 35 | 13th | R8 | SF | EL, 2QR | Ahmad Saba'a | 11 |
| 2013–14 | Leumit | 37 | 24 | 9 | 4 | 67 | 35 | 81 | 1st | Final | – | – | Eran Levy | 16 |
| 2014–15 | Premier | 33 | 11 | 8 | 14 | 46 | 54 | 41 | 9th | R8 | Group | – | Larry Kayode | 13 |
| 2015–16 | Premier | 33 | 1 | 9 | 23 | 14 | 50 | 12 | 14th | R8 | QF | – | Gael Margulies; Hamza Barry | 3 |

== Key ==
- P = Played
- W = Games won
- D = Games drawn
- L = Games lost
- F = Goals for
- A = Goals against
- Pts = Points
- Pos = Final position
- Leumit = Liga Leumit (National League)
- Artzit = Liga Artzit (Nationwide League)
- Premier = Liga Al (Premier League)
- Pal. League = Palestine League
- F = Final
- Group = Group stage
- QF = Quarter-finals
- QR1 = First Qualifying Round
- QR2 = Second Qualifying Round
- QR3 = Third Qualifying Round
- QR4 = Fourth Qualifying Round
- RInt = Intermediate Round
- R1 = Round 1
- R2 = Round 2
- R3 = Round 3
- R4 = Round 4
- R5 = Round 5
- R6 = Round 6
- SF = Semi-finals

| Champions | Runners-up | Promoted | Relegated |
