= 1954–55 Hapoel Hadera F.C. season =

Hapoel Hadera
1954–55 season
- Manager: Ben Zion Dvorkin
- Stadium: Hapoel Ground, Hadera
- Liga Alef: not completed
- State Cup: not completed
- Top goalscorer: League: Gedalyahu Piterman (6); All: Salomon (7)

The 1954–55 Hapoel Hadera season was the club's 22nd season since its establishment, in 1934, and 7th since the establishment of the State of Israel.

During the season, the club competed in Liga Alef (top division) and the State Cup.

== Match Results ==
=== Legend ===
Win Draw Loss

=== Liga Alef ===
League matches began on 6 February 1955, and by the time the season, only 20 rounds of matches were completed, delaying the end of the league season to the next season.

==== League table (as of 2 July 1955) ====
Pos	Club	P	W	D	L	GF	GA	GR	Pts
10	Hapoel Haifa	20	6	6	8	31	35	0.89	18
11	Hapoel Ramat Gan	20	7	3	10	23	27	0.85	17
12	Beitar Jerusalem	20	5	5	10	27	47	0.57	15
13	Hapoel Hadera	20	6	2	12	24	37	0.65	14
14	Hapoel Balfouria	20	2	2	16	23	92	0.25	6

==== Matches ====
5 February 1955 1	Hapoel Tel Aviv	2–0	Hapoel Hadera	Tel Aviv
	Rosenbaum 20'; Hecht 78'	Report (p. 8)		Stadium: Basa Stadium; Attendance: 2,500; Referee: Yelink

12 February 1955 2	Hapoel Hadera	2–0	Maccabi Petah Tikva	Hadera
	Halfon 72'; Weinberg 90'			Stadium: Hapoel Ground; Attendance: 1,500; Referee: Dudkevich

19 February 1955 3	Hapoel Kfar Saba	4–1	Hapoel Hadera	Kfar Saba
	Schmilovich 35' (pen.), 55'; H. Glazer 62' (pen.), 70'	Report (p. 8)	88' Piterman	Stadium: Hapoel Ground; Attendance: 1,500; Referee: Parnas

26 February 1955 4	Hapoel Hadera	2–0	Hapoel Ramat Gan	Hadera
	Piterman 47'; Weinberg 89' (pen.)	Report (p. 8)		Stadium: Hapoel Ground; Attendance: 2,000; Referee: Levichter

5 March 1955 5	Maccabi Netanya	0–1	Hapoel Hadera	Netanya
		Report (p. 8)	64' Piterman	Stadium: Sar-Tov Stadium; Attendance: 1,000; Referee: Werner

12 March 1955 6	Maccabi Tel Aviv	1–0	Hapoel Hadera	Tel Aviv
	Barzilai 70' (o.g.)	Report (p. 8)		Stadium: Basa Stadium; Attendance: 3,000; Referee: Asa

19 March 1955 7	Hapoel Hadera	2–5	Beitar Tel Aviv	Hadera
	Gali 44'; Salomon 75'	Report (p. 8)	29' Huli; 45' (o.g.) Weinberg; 64', 84' Elmaliah; 77' Bar-Zion	Stadium: Hapoel Ground; Attendance: 1,000; Referee: Klein

1 April 1955 8	Hapoel Hadera	1–3	Maccabi Haifa	Hadera
	Piterman 24'	Report	14', 77' Held; 85' Tenenmaum	Stadium: Hapoel Ground; Attendance: 1,000; Referee: Werner

9 April 1955 9	Hapoel Hadera	0–3	Hapoel Petah Tikva	Hadera
		Report (p. 8)	46' Mizrahi; 41' Chirik; 80' Zelikovich	Stadium: Hapoel Ground; Attendance: 1,500; Referee: Frizner

13 April 1955 10	Hapoel Hadera	2–0	Beitar Jerusalem	Hadera
	Piterman 21'; Halfon 52'	Report (p. 4)		Stadium: Hapoel Ground; Attendance: 1,500; Referee: Zilberman

16 April 1955 11	Hapoel Balfouria	3–1	Hapoel Hadera	Afula
	Tal 15'; Kochavi 24'; Kushnir 66'	Report (p. 8)	57' Salomon	Stadium: Hapoel Ground; Attendance: 1,200; Referee: Markovich

23 April 1955 12	Hapoel Haifa	2–2	Hapoel Hadera	Haifa
	Shamir 67'; Martin 72' (pen.)	Report (p. 8)	20' Piterman; 48' Weissberg	Stadium: Kiryat Haim Stadium; Attendance: 200; Referee: Werner

30 April 1955 13	Hapoel Hadera	4–2	Maccabi Rehovot	Hadera
	Weissberg 1', 21', 75'; Salomon 40'	Report (p. 8)	43' (pen.) Litvak; 69' Hershkovitz	Stadium: Hapoel Ground; Attendance: 2,000; Referee: Levinger

14 May 1955 14	Hapoel Hadera	0–1	Hapoel Tel Aviv	Hadera
		Report (p. 8)	60' Rosenbaum	Stadium: Hapoel Ground; Attendance: 2,800; Referee: Dudkevich

21 May 1955 15	Maccabi Petah Tikva	1–1	Hapoel Hadera	Petah Tikva
	Ben Dror 37'	Report (p. 8)	27' Afgin	Stadium: Maccabi Ground; Attendance: 2,000; Referee: Fried

4 June 1955 16	Hapoel Hadera	3–1	Hapoel Kfar Saba	Hadera
	Rubin 9', 28', 67'	Report (p. 8)	74' Avrutski	Stadium: Hapoel Ground; Attendance: 1,500; Referee: Frizner

11 June 1955 17	Hapoel Ramat Gan	2–0	Hapoel Hadera	Givatayim
	Fon 46' (o.g.); Chronsich 67'	Report (p. 8)		Stadium: HaMakhtesh Stadium; Attendance: 1,500; Referee: Rosenbaum

19 June 1955 18	Hapoel Hadera	0–1	Maccabi Netanya	Hadera
		Report (p. 8)	59' H. Meller	Stadium: Hapoel Ground; Attendance: 1,500; Referee: Ben-Rubi

26 June 1955 19	Hapoel Hadera	1–2	Maccabi Tel Aviv	Hadera
	Salomon 55'	Report (p. 8)	25', 90' Studinski	Stadium: Hapoel Ground; Attendance: 2,500; Referee: Rosenbaum

2 July 1955 20	Beitar Tel Aviv	4–1	Hapoel Hadera	Tel Aviv
	Elmaliah 70' (pen.), 76', 85', 90'	Report (p. 8)	65' Salomon	Stadium: Basa Stadium; Attendance: 3,000; Referee: Scheindling

==== Results by match ====
Match	1	2	3	4	5	6	7	8	9	10	11	12	13	14	15	16	17	18	19	20
Result	L	W	L	W	W	L	L	L	L	W	L	D	W	L	D	W	L	L	L	L
Position	13	8	10	7	6	7	9	11	13	9	11	12	9	11	10	9	11	12	12	13

Updated to match(es) played on 3 July 1955. Source: 2 Dear Points
W = Win; D = Draw; L = Loss

=== State Cup ===
26 March 1955 Round 3	Maccabi Ein Ganim	2–3	Hapoel Hadera	Petah Tikva
	Burstein 26'; Levi 78'		61' Fon; 75', 85' Salomon	Stadium: Maccabi Ground; Attendance: 300; Referee: Zahavi

28 May 1955 Round 4	Hapoel Hadera	1–0	Hapoel Tel Aviv	Hadera
	Afgin 26'			Stadium: Hapoel Ground; Attendance: 1,500; Referee: Rosenbaum
