= 1955–56 Maccabi Rehovot F.C. season =

Maccabi Rehovot
1955–56 season
- Manager: Moshe Litvak
- Stadium: Maccabi Ground, Rehovot
- Liga Alef (1955) Liga Leumit (1956): 8th 11th (relegated)
- Top goalscorer: Moshe Litvak (11)

The 1955–56 Maccabi Rehovot season was the club's 45th season since its establishment in 1912, and 8th since the establishment of the State of Israel.

At the start of the season, the league which started during the previous season was completed, with the club finishing 8th. The new league season, with the top division being re-named Liga Leumit, began on 3 December 1955 and was completed on 3 June 1956, with the club finishing 11th and relegating to Liga Alef.

== Match Results ==
=== Legend ===
Win Draw Loss

=== 1954–55 Liga Alef ===
The league began on 6 February 1955, and by the time the previous season ended, only 20 rounds of matches were completed, with the final 6 rounds being played during September and October 1955.

==== Final table ====
Pos	Club	P	W	D	L	GF	GA	Gr	Pts
6	Maccabi Haifa	26	11	6	9	54	41	1.32	28
7	Maccabi Petah Tikva	26	10	7	9	37	41	0.90	27
8	Maccabi Rehovot	26	11	4	11	49	48	1.02	26
9	Hapoel Haifa	26	9	6	11	40	55	0.73	24
10	Hapoel Ramat Gan	26	10	3	13	35	41	0.85	23

==== Matches ====
3 September 1955 21	Maccabi Netanya	1–0	Maccabi Rehovot	Netanya
	I. Caspi 25'	Report (p. 8)		Stadium: Sar-Tov Stadium; Attendance: 1,000; Referee: Moshe Cohen

10 September 1955 22	Maccabi Rehovot	2–1	Maccabi Tel Aviv	Rehovot
	Herschkovitz 2'; Schmilovich 7'	Report (p. 8)	70' Merimovich	Stadium: Maccabi Ground; Attendance: 1,800; Referee: Dudkevich

24 September 1955 23	Beitar Tel Aviv	2–5	Maccabi Rehovot	Tel Aviv
	Bar-Zion 28'; Huli 66'	Report (p. 8)	40' Schmilovich; 42', 78' Litvak; 84', 89' Herschkovitz	Stadium: Basa Stadium; Attendance: 4,000; Referee: Cohen

1 October 1955 24	Maccabi Rehovot	3–2	Maccabi Haifa	Rehovot
	Shrager 13', 32'; Litvak 75'	Report (p. 8)	39' Hardy; 78' Fuchs	Stadium: Maccabi Ground; Attendance: 2,200; Referee: Werner

8 October 1955 25	Hapoel Petah Tikva	3–0	Maccabi Rehovot	Petah Tikva
	Kofman 6'; Stelmach 12'; Zelikovich 60'	Report (p. 8)		Stadium: Hapoel Ground; Attendance: 4,000; Referee: Nahman Cohen

15 October 1955 26	Maccabi Rehovot	4–2	Hapoel Hadera	Rehovot
	Jamil 4'; Shrager 23'; Herschkovitz 35'; Litvak 46'	Report (p. 8)	6' Gali; 80' Haviv	Stadium: Maccabi Ground; Attendance: 1,500; Referee: Markovich

=== 1955–56 Liga Leumit ===
==== Final table ====
Pos	Club	P	W	D	L	GF	GA	GR	Pts	Notes
8	Maccabi Netanya	22	9	2	11	31	44	0.70	20	
9	Hapoel Ramat Gan	22	9	0	13	28	42	0.67	18	
10	Maccabi Jaffa	22	6	5	11	39	48	0.81	17	Promotion/relegation play-offs
11	Maccabi Rehovot	22	6	1	15	25	64	0.39	13	Relegated to Liga Alef
12	Hapoel Kfar Saba	22	3	6	13	20	48	0.42	12	Relegated to Liga Alef

==== Matches ====
3 December 1955 1	Beitar Tel Aviv	6–3	Maccabi Rehovot	Tel Aviv
	Huli 1', 25', 54', 58'; Elmaliah 38', 60'		20' Vider; 82', 85' Litvak	Stadium: Basa Stadium; Attendance: 3,000; Referee: Dudkevich

10 December 1955 2	Maccabi Rehovot	1–2	Hapoel Ramat Gan	Rehovot
	Litvak 66' (pen.)		41' Chronsich; 88' (pen.) Kirschenberg	Stadium: Maccabi Ground; Attendance: 1,500; Referee: Nahman Cohen

17 December 1955 3	Maccabi Rehovot	3–1	Maccabi Netanya	Rehovot
	Mansur 37', 59'; G. Cohen 60'		84' Lemel	Stadium: Maccabi Ground; Attendance: 1,500; Referee: Sher

24 December 1955 4	Maccabi Haifa	5–0	Maccabi Rehovot	Haifa
	Ben-Tzvi 8' (pen.); Held 42', 75'; S. Levi 67'; Hardy 86'			Stadium: Kiryat Eliezer Stadium; Attendance: 3,500; Referee: Fried

31 December 1955 5	Hapoel Kfar Saba	0–0	Maccabi Rehovot	Kfar Saba
				Stadium: Hapoel Ground; Referee: Ben-Rubi

7 January 1956 6	Maccabi Rehovot	3–2	Hapoel Tel Aviv	Rehovot
	Litvak 12'; Schmilovich 23'; Hodorov 70' (o.g.)		85' (pen.) Hodorov; 89' Michaelov	Stadium: Maccabi Ground

14 January 1956 7	Hapoel Haifa	3–0	Maccabi Rehovot	Haifa
	Nestenfober 4'; Ben-David 24'; Ginzburg 83'			Stadium: Kiryat Eliezer Stadium; Referee: Rosenbaum

21 January 1956 8	Maccabi Petah Tikva	1–0	Maccabi Rehovot	Petah Tikva
	Spiegel 62'			Stadium: Maccabi Ground; Attendance: 1,500; Referee: Klein

11 February 1956 9	Maccabi Rehovot	0–7	Maccabi Tel Aviv	Rehovot
		Report	26', 65', 76' Studinski; 47' Merimovich; 68' Schneor; 70' Israeli; 90' Nahmias	Stadium: Maccabi Ground; Attendance: 2,000; Referee: Hoze

18 February 1956 10	Maccabi Rehovot	3–1	Maccabi Jaffa	Rehovot
	Vider 13', 17'; Mansur 53'		B. Cohen	Stadium: Maccabi Ground; Attendance: 3,000; Referee: Schwartz

25 February 1956 11	Hapoel Petah Tikva	3–0	Maccabi Rehovot	Petah Tikva
	Zelikovich 44'; Nahari 68'; Stemlach 89'			Stadium: Hapoel Ground

3 March 1956 12	Maccabi Rehovot	1–0	Beitar Tel Aviv	Rehovot
	Litvak 74' (pen.)			Stadium: Maccabi Ground; Attendance: 1,200; Referee: Halperin

10 March 1956 13	Hapoel Ramat Gan	3–2	Maccabi Rehovot	Givatayim
	Mesika 11'; Kirschenberg 33'; Migdalovich 54'		23' (pen.) Litvak; 43' Lieber	Stadium: HaMakhtesh Stadium; Referee: Hillman

17 March 1956 14	Maccabi Netanya	2–1	Maccabi Rehovot	Netanya
	I. Caspi 11', 50'		36' Pepinos	Stadium: Sar-Tov Stadium

24 March 1956 15	Maccabi Rehovot	0–3	Maccabi Haifa	Rehovot
			49' Held; 63', 76' Menchel	Stadium: Maccabi Ground; Referee: Rosenbaum

31 March 1956 16	Maccabi Rehovot	3–2	Hapoel Kfar Saba	Rehovot
	Vider 71', 75' (pen.), 90'		25' Tobiash; 52' (pen.) Bulman	Stadium: Maccabi Ground; Referee: Zahavi

7 April 1956 17	Hapoel Tel Aviv	7–1	Maccabi Rehovot	Tel Aviv
	Weiss 1' (pen.); Michaelov 3', 31', 52', 54'; R. Rosenbaum 67'; Yehudayoff 85'		34' Rosenbaum	Stadium: Basa Stadium; Attendance: 2,500; Referee: Sher

14 April 1956 18	Maccabi Rehovot	1–0	Hapoel Haifa	Rehovot
	Vider 86'			Stadium: Maccabi Ground; Referee: Werner

22 April 1956 19	Maccabi Rehovot	1–2	Maccabi Petah Tikva	Rehovot
	Vider 50'		23', 55' Spiegel	Stadium: Maccabi Ground; Referee: Dudkevich

19 May 1956 20	Maccabi Tel Aviv	5–1	Maccabi Rehovot	Tel Aviv
	Glazer 4'; Nahmias 31'; Dobrin 67'; Israeli 70'; Kofman 76' (o.g.)		13' (pen.) Vider	Stadium: Basa Stadium; Attendance: 5,000; Referee: Rosenbaum

27 May 1956 21	Maccabi Jaffa	6–1	Maccabi Rehovot	Tel Aviv
	B. Cohen 15', 42', 59', 61', 77'; Ghougasian 51'		19' Litvak	Stadium: Maccabi Jaffa Ground; Attendance: 3,500

2 June 1956 22	Maccabi Rehovot	0–3	Hapoel Petah Tikva	Rehovot
			28' Stelmach; 60' (pen.) Kermer; 85' Nahari	Stadium: Maccabi Ground; Referee: Fried
