= 1955–56 Maccabi Netanya F.C. season =

Maccabi Netanya
1955–56 season
- Stadium: Sar-Tov Stadium
- Liga Alef (1955) Liga Leumit (1956): 4th 8th
- Top goalscorer: League: Itzhak Caspi (18); All: Itzhak Caspi (20)

The 1955–56 Maccabi Netanya season was the club's 22nd season since its establishment in 1934, and 8th since the establishment of the State of Israel.

At the start of the season, the league which started during the previous season was completed, with the club finishing 4th. The new league season, with the top division being renamed Liga Leumit, began on 3 December 1955 and was completed on 3 June 1956, with the club finishing 8th.

In addition, during the break between the completion of the 1954–55 league and the beginning of the 1955–56 league, the club participated in the Netanya 25th anniversary cup, along with Beitar Tel Aviv, Maccabi Petah Tikva and Hapoel Ramat Gan. In the competition, which was played as a round-robin tournament, the club finished third.

== Match Results ==
=== Legend ===
Win Draw Loss

=== International friendly matches ===
During the season Maccabi Netanya played two international friendly matches, losing both matches.

2 February 1956	Maccabi Netanya	0–2	(Socialist Federal Republic of Yugoslavia) FK Sarajevo	Netanya
		Davar (in Hebrew)	13' Pašić; 69' Jusufbegović	Stadium: Sar-Tov Stadium; Attendance: 4,000; Referee: Frizner

25 June 1956	Maccabi Netanya	1–5	(Austria) First Vienna	Netanya
	Hosias 8'		22' Manasse; 32' Pichler; 40' Buzek; 79', 85' (pen.) Walzhofer	Stadium: Sar-Tov Stadium; Attendance: 4,000

=== 1954–55 Liga Alef ===
The league began on 6 February 1955, and by the time the previous season ended, only 20 rounds of matches were completed, with the final 6 rounds being played during September and October 1955.

==== Final table ====
Pos	Club	P	W	D	L	GF	GA	GR	Pts
2	Maccabi Tel Aviv	26	17	4	5	84	28	3.00	38
3	Hapoel Tel Aviv	26	12	9	5	49	23	2.13	33
4	Maccabi Netanya	26	13	7	6	54	43	1.26	33
5	Beitar Tel Aviv	26	12	5	9	64	47	1.36	29
6	Maccabi Haifa	26	11	6	9	54	41	1.32	28

==== Matches ====
3 September 1955 21	Maccabi Netanya	1–0	Maccabi Rehovot	Netanya
	I. Caspi 25'	Report (p. 8)		Stadium: Sar-Tov Stadium; Attendance: 1,000; Referee: Moshe Cohen

10 September 1955 22	Maccabi Netanya	3–2	Hapoel Tel Aviv	Netanya
	Segal 50'; I. Caspi 81', 85'	Report (p. 8)	35' Rosenbaum; 60' Yehudayoff	Stadium: Sar-Tov Stadium; Attendance: 2,500; Referee: Rosenbaum

24 September 1955 23	Maccabi Petah Tikva	0–1	Maccabi Netanya	Petah Tikva
		Report (p. 8)	42' Y. Spiegel	Stadium: Maccabi Ground; Attendance: 1,200; Referee: Scheindling

1 October 1955 24	Hapoel Kfar Saba	0–1	Maccabi Netanya	Kfar Saba
		Report (p. 8)	66' M. Cohen	Stadium: Hapoel Ground; Attendance: 2,500; Referee: Rosenbaum

8 October 1955 25	Maccabi Netanya	5–1	Hapoel Ramat Gan	Netanya
	I. Caspi 47', 68'; M. Cohen 50', 70'; Yehezkel 82'	Report (p. 8)	52' Fritzner	Stadium: Sar-Tov Stadium; Attendance: 2,500; Referee: Werner

15 October 1955 26	Beitar Jerusalem	1–4	Maccabi Netanya	Jerusalem
	Elfasi 86' (pen.)	Report (p. 8)	4', 69', 80', 87' (pen.) I. Caspi	Stadium: YMCA Stadium; Attendance: 5,000; Referee: Moshe Cohen

==== Results by match ====
Round	1	2	3	4	5	6	7	8	9	10	11	12	13	14	15	16	17	18	19	20	21	22	23	24	25	26
Result	L	L	D	L	L	W	D	W	D	D	L	W	W	D	W	L	D	W	W	D	W	W	W	W	W	W
Position	9	11	13	14	13	13	12	10	10	8	10	8	7	7	7	8	8	7	7	7	7	6	5	4	4	4

Updated to match(es) played on 15 October 1955. Source: 2 Dear Points
W = Win; D = Draw; L = Loss

=== 1955–56 Liga Leumit ===
==== Final table ====
Pos	Club	P	W	D	L	GF	GA	GR	Pts	
6	Hapoel Haifa	22	9	4	9	32	39	0.82	22	
7	Beitar Tel Aviv	22	10	0	12	42	44	0.95	20	
8	Maccabi Netanya	22	9	2	11	31	44	0.70	20	
9	Hapoel Ramat Gan	22	9	0	13	28	42	0.67	18	
10	Maccabi Jaffa	22	6	5	11	39	48	0.81	17	Promotion/relegation play-offs

==== Matches ====
3 December 1955 1	Maccabi Netanya	3–3	Hapoel Kfar Saba	Netanya
	H. Meller 35'; I. Caspi 36'; 63' Statzki		3' Ratz; 20' Tenenbaum; 26' Tobiash	Stadium: Sar-Tov Stadium; Attendance: 2,500; Referee: Rosenbaum

10 December 1955 2	Hapoel Tel Aviv	2–0	Maccabi Netanya	Tel Aviv
	Yehudayoff 54', 60'			Stadium: Basa Stadium; Attendance: 3,000; Referee: Fried

17 December 1955 3	Maccabi Rehovot	3–1	Maccabi Netanya	Rehovot
	Mansur 37', 59'; G. Cohen 60'		84' Lemel	Stadium: Maccabi Ground; Attendance: 1,500; Referee: Sher

24 December 1955 4	Maccabi Netanya	1–3	Hapoel Petah Tikva	Netanya
	H. Meller 81'		68' Kofman; 70' Stelmach; 75' Markus	Stadium: Sar-Tov Stadium; Attendance: 2,000; Referee: Klein

31 December 1955 5	Hapoel Haifa	3–2	Maccabi Netanya	Haifa
	Nestenfober 27', 65'; Ginzburg 35'		2', 64' Lemel	Stadium: Kiryat Eliezer Stadium; Attendance: 2,000; Referee: Hechtberg

7 January 1956 6	Maccabi Netanya	0–0	Maccabi Petah Tikva	Netanya
				Stadium: Sar-Tov Stadium; Referee: Sher

14 January 1956 7	Maccabi Netanya	2–1	Maccabi Tel Aviv	Netanya
	Hosias 73'; Statzki 78'		22' Studinski	Stadium: Sar-Tov Stadium; Referee: Hoze

21 January 1956 8	Maccabi Netanya	2–0	Maccabi Jaffa	Netanya
	Sudek 44' (pen.); Shrager 61'			Stadium: Sar-Tov Stadium; Attendance: 3,500; Referee: Werner

11 February 1956 9	Hapoel Ramat Gan	4–2	Maccabi Netanya	Givatayim
	Chronsich 17', 60'; I. Kirschenberg 30' (pen.); Radler 70'		46' Shrager; 72' I. Caspi	Stadium: HaMakhtesh Stadium; Referee: Hillman

18 February 1956 10	Maccabi Haifa	0–2	Maccabi Netanya	Haifa
			43', 50' (pen.) I. Caspi	Stadium: Kiryat Eliezer Stadium; Referee: Fried

25 February 1956 11	Maccabi Netanya	1–0	Beitar Tel Aviv	Netanya
	Caspi 60'			Stadium: Sar-Tov Stadium; Attendance: 2,500; Referee: Schwartz

3 March 1956 12	Hapoel Kfar Saba	0–2	Maccabi Netanya	Kfar Saba
			30' M. Cohen; 32' I. Caspi	Stadium: Hapoel Ground; Attendance: 1,200; Referee: Fried

10 March 1956 13	Maccabi Netanya	1–2	Hapoel Tel Aviv	Netanya
	I. Caspi 38'		5' Yehudayoff; Rosenbaum	Stadium: Sar-Tov Stadium; Attendance: 3,000; Referee: Sher

17 March 1956 14	Maccabi Netanya	2–1	Maccabi Rehovot	Netanya
	I. Caspi 11', 50'		36' Pepinos	Stadium: Sar-Tov Stadium

24 March 1956 15	Hapoel Petah Tikva	6–0	Maccabi Netanya	Petah Tikva
	Nahari 6', 19', 78'; Stelmach 57'; Z. Ratzabi 65'; Kofman 81'			Stadium: Hapoel Ground; Referee: Dudkevich

31 March 1956 16	Maccabi Netanya	3–1	Hapoel Haifa	Netanya
	Shrager 5'; Lemel 11'; Hosias 60'		2' Ginzburg	Stadium: Sar-Tov Stadium; Attendance: 2,000; Referee: Werner

7 April 1956 17	Maccabi Petah Tikva	4–1	Maccabi Netanya	Petah Tikva
	Rabinson 50'; Scharf 65', 73'; I. Ben-Dror 79' (pen.)		6' Shrager	Stadium: Maccabi Ground

14 April 1956 18	Maccabi Tel Aviv	3–0	Maccabi Netanya	Tel Aviv
	Schneor 5'; Glazer 14'; Merimovich 65'			Stadium: Basa Stadium; Attendance: 2,500; Referee: Klein

22 April 1956 19	Maccabi Jaffa	2–3	Maccabi Netanya	Tel Aviv
	Aroyo 78'; Besserglick 81' (pen.)		7', 42' Lemel; 11' Statzki	Stadium: Maccabi Jaffa Ground; Referee: M. Cohen

19 May 1956 20	Maccabi Netanya	0–3	Hapoel Ramat Gan	Netanya
			32' Rozin; 37' R. Cohen; 41' Tsalala	Stadium: Sar-Tov Stadium; Attendance: 1,500; Referee: Schwartz

27 May 1956 21	Maccabi Netanya	3–1	Maccabi Haifa	Netanya
	Shrager 9'; Orenstein 50'; Statzki 64'		88' (o.g.) H. Meller	Stadium: Sar-Tov Stadium; Attendance: 1,500; Referee: Sher

2 June 1956 22	Beitar Tel Aviv	2–0	Maccabi Netanya	Tel Aviv
	Arbiv 6'; Huli 34'			Stadium: Basa Stadium; Attendance: 10,000; Referee: Dudkevich

==== Results by match ====
Round	1	2	3	4	5	6	7	8	9	10	11	12	13	14	15	16	17	18	19	20	21	22
Result	D	L	L	L	L	D	W	W	L	W	W	W	L	W	L	W	L	L	W	L	W	L
Position	5	9	10	10	11	11	10	8	8	8	8	8	8	8	8	8	8	8	8	8	7	8

Updated to match(es) played on 28 July 1956. Source: IFA
W = Win; D = Draw; L = Loss

=== Netanya 25th Anniversary Cup ===
In October and November, while the promotion playoffs and the State Cup were being played, two cup competitions were organized by Liga Leumit Clubs, the second edition of the Shapira Cup, and the Netanya 25th Anniversary Cup. Maccabi Netanya, Maccabi Netanya, Maccabi Netanya and Hapoel Ramat Gan took part in the competition, dedicated to the 25th anniversary of Netanya.

==== Table ====
Pos	Team	Pld	W	D	L	GF	GA	GR	Pts	Qualification
1	Maccabi Petah Tikva	3	2	1	0	14	5	2.800	5	Winners
2	Hapoel Ramat Gan	3	1	1	1	8	7	1.143	3	
3	Maccabi Netanya	3	1	1	1	5	7	0.714	3	
4	Beitar Tel Aviv	3	0	1	2	7	15	0.467	1	

Source: Hadshot HaSport, p. 1

29 October 1955 1	Maccabi Netanya	0–4	Maccabi Petah Tikva	Givatayim
		Report (p. 8)	3', 37' I. Ben Dror; 16' Spiegel; 77' Nadel	Stadium: HaMakhtesh Stadium; Attendance: 1,500; Referee: Metzler

5 November 1955 2	Maccabi Netanya	3–1	Hapoel Ramat Gan	Petah Tikva
	I. Caspi 10', 51'; Orenstein , 79'	Report (p. 8)	, 9' Mordechovich	Stadium: Maccabi Ground; Attendance: 1,500; Referee: Zahavi

12 November 1955 3	Maccabi Netanya	2–2	Beitar Tel Aviv	Netanya
	Lemel 23'; Meller 40'	Report (p. 8)	22' Emaliah; 65' Arbiv	Stadium: Sar-Tov Stadium; Attendance: 3,000; Referee: Dudkevich
