= 1957–58 in Israeli football =

Football in Israel
- Season: 1957–58

Men's football
- Liga Leumit: Maccabi Tel Aviv
- Liga Alef: Beitar Jerusalem
- Liga Bet: Hapoel Tiberias; Hapoel Ramla
- Israel Super Cup: Hapoel Tel Aviv

The 1958–59 season was the tenth season of competitive football in Israel and the 32nd season under the Israeli Football Association, established in 1928, during the British Mandate.

== Review and Events ==
The national team was due to play in the 1958 World Cup qualification against Indonesia and then against Sudan. As the two teams refused to meet Israel, and as FIFA imposed a rule that no team would qualify without playing at least one match, the national team was drawn to play against Wales national football team. Israel lost the two matches 0–2.

In May 1958 the IFA stopped matches in the leagues below Liga Leumit due to suspicions of bribery. Following an inquiry, the matches did not resume, and promotions and relegations were suspended.

During May 1958 the national team participated in the 1958 Asian Games, losing at the quarter-finals to Republic of China.

== Domestic leagues ==
=== Promotion and relegation ===
Due to the inquiry set by the IFA regarding claims of fixed matches in Liga Alef and the lower leagues, promotions and relegations were suspended, and the leagues resumed the next season with the same composition.

== Domestic cups ==
The 1957–58 Israel State Cup started on 12 October 1957, reached the quarter-finals phase by July 1958, and was delayed over an appeal made by Hapoel Petah Tikva over the team's loss to Maccabi Tel Aviv and was completed in September 1958.

In November 1957, a match was arranged as a remembrance for Lt-Col Zivi Tzafriri between league champions Hapoel Tel Aviv and cup holders Hapoel Petah Tikva. Although the match was arranged without the IFA, it is considered the first Israel Super Cup match. Hapoel Tel Aviv won the match 3–0.

== National Teams ==
=== National team ===
==== 1958 World Cup qualification ====
The national team was placed in the African/Asian zone and was drawn to play against Turkey in the first round. However, Turkey withdrew in protest of being placed in the African/Asian zone (instead of the European Zone), and Israel advanced to the second round without playing a match, along with Indonesia, Egypt and Sudan.

Israel was drawn to play Indonesia, but, as Indonesia refused to play in Israel and as FIFA rejected their request to play against Israel on neutral ground, Indonesia withdrew and Israel advanced to the regional finals, again without playing a match, alongside Sudan.

In the final round, Sudan refused to play Israel for political reasons and withdrew. The withdrawal meant that Israel had won the qualification spot for the African/Asian zone, but as the team did not play a match throughout the campaign, and as FIFA ruled that no team would qualify without playing at least one match (except for the defending champions and the hosts), an opponent for Israel was drawn from the runners-up in the other zones. Wales, runners-up in UEFA Group 4 won the draw.

Pos	Team	Pld	W	D	L	GF	GA	GD	Pts
1	Wales	2	2	0	0	4	0	+4	4
2	Israel	2	0	0	2	0	4	−4	0

==== 1958 Asian Games ====
===== Group stage – Group D =====
Team	Pld	W	D	L	GF	GA	GR	Pts
South Korea	2	2	0	0	7	1	7.000	4
Israel	2	2	0	0	6	1	6.000	4
Singapore	2	0	0	2	2	4	0.500	0
Iran	2	0	0	2	0	9	0.000	0

===== Quarter-finals =====
30 May

Republic of China	2–0	Israel

Metropolitan Stadium, Tokyo

Israel was eliminated at the quarter-finals stage and placed 5th in the competition.

==== 1957–58 matches ====
8 October 1957 Friendly, Unofficial	Israel	4–5	France B	Ramat Gan
	Ghouhasian 22', 90'; Mordechovich 52'; Glazer 80'		Vincent 11'; Gardien 26', 50'; Biancheri 75'; Glowacki 89'	Stadium: Ramat Gan Stadium; Attendance: 22,000; Referee: (Netherlands) Leo Horn

15 January 1958 WCQ	Israel	0–2	Wales	Ramat Gan
		Report	L. Allchurch 38'; Bowen 65'	Stadium: Ramat Gan Stadium; Attendance: 60,000; Referee: (France) Guigue

5 February 1958 WCQ	Wales	2–0	Israel	Cardiff
	I. Allchurch 76'; Jones 80'	Report		Stadium: Ninian Park; Attendance: 30,000; Referee: (Netherlands) Klas Schipper

26 May 1958 Asian Games	Israel	4–0	Iran	Tokyo
	Glazer 21'; Stelmach 30', 78'; Reznik 67' (pen.)			Stadium: Metropolitan Stadium; Attendance: 7,500; Referee: (Japan) Murakata

28 May 1958 Asian Games	Israel	2–1	Singapore	Tokyo
	Nahari 5'; Stelmach 42'		Koh 37'	Stadium: Korakuen Velodrome; Attendance: 1,500; Referee: (Japan) Yokoyama

30 May 1958 Asian Games QF	Israel	0–2	Rep. of China	Tokyo
			Goal	Stadium: Metropolitan Stadium; Attendance: 15,000; Referee: (South Korea) In Dong-Chung
