= 1954–55 Maccabi Netanya F.C. season =

Maccabi Netanya
1954–55 season
- Manager: Csibi Braun
- Stadium: Sar-Tov Stadium
- Liga Alef: not completed
- State Cup: Round 4
- Top goalscorer: League: Max Cohen (12); All: Max Cohen (14)

The 1954–55 Maccabi Netanya season was the club's 21st season since its establishment in 1934, and 7th since the establishment of the State of Israel.

During the season, the club competed in Liga Alef (top division) and the State Cup.

== Match Results ==
=== Legend ===
Win Draw Loss

=== Liga Alef ===
League matches began on 6 February 1955, and by the time the season, only 20 rounds of matches were completed, delaying the end of the league season to the next season.

==== League table (as of 2 July 1955) ====
Pos	Club	P	W	D	L	GF	GA	GR	Pts
5	Maccabi Petah Tikva	20	8	6	6	27	24	1.13	22
6	Maccabi Haifa	20	8	5	7	36	29	1.24	21
7	Maccabi Netanya	20	7	7	6	39	39	1.00	21
8	Hapoel Kfar Saba	20	6	6	8	29	30	0.97	18
9	Maccabi Rehovot	20	7	4	9	35	37	0.95	18

==== Matches ====
5 February 1955 1	Maccabi Tel Aviv	6–1	Maccabi Netanya	Tel Aviv
	Studinski 15', 88'; Levi 31'; Halivner 46'; Glazer 50'; Israeli 67'	Report (p. 8)	44' Caspi	Stadium: Basa Stadium; Attendance: 2,500; Referee: Cohen

12 February 1955 2	Beitar Tel Aviv	2–1	Maccabi Netanya	Tel Aviv
	Huli 48' (pen.); Elmaliah 57'	Report (p. 8)	21' Statzki	Stadium: Basa Stadium; Attendance: 2,500; Referee: Markovich

19 February 1955 3	Maccabi Netanya	4–4	Maccabi Haifa	Netanya
	M. Cohen 11', 83'; I. Caspi 56' (pen.); Y. Spiegel 71'	Report	2', 30', 43' Hardy; 86' (pen.) Ben-Tzvi	Stadium: Sar-Tov Stadium; Attendance: 1,000; Referee: Silbermann

26 February 1955 4	Maccabi Netanya	0–3 (w/o) (abandoned)	Hapoel Petah Tikva	Netanya
	Hosias 18'	Report (p. 8)	3' (pen.) Kofman; 42' Zelikovich; 80' Stelmach	Stadium: Sar-Tov Stadium; Attendance: 2,000; Referee: Dudkevich

5 March 1955 5	Maccabi Netanya	0–1	Hapoel Hadera	Netanya
		Report (p. 8)	64' Piterman	Stadium: Sar-Tov Stadium; Attendance: 1,000; Referee: Werner

12 March 1955 6	Hapoel Balfouria	2–4	Maccabi Netanya	Afula
	Kohavi 59'; Kushnir 84'		17' M. Cohen; 29', 68' Orenstein; 38' H. Meller	Stadium: Hapoel Ground

19 March 1955 7	Maccabi Netanya	2–2	Hapoel Haifa	Netanya
	M. Cohen 10', 60'	Report (p. 8)	17', 70' Martin	Stadium: Sar-Tov Stadium; Attendance: 1,000; Referee: Cohen

2 April 1955 8	Maccabi Rehovot	0–1	Maccabi Netanya	Rehovot
			Hosias	Stadium: Maccabi Ground

9 April 1955 9	Hapoel Tel Aviv	1–1	Maccabi Rehovot	Tel Aviv
	Alaluf 83'	Report (p. 8)	61' Hosias	Stadium: Basa Stadium; Attendance: 1,500; Referee: Zahavi

13 April 1955 10	Maccabi Netanya	2–2	Maccabi Petah Tikva	Netanya
	H. Meller 55', 80'	Report (p. 4)	22' Spiegel; 40' Nadel	Stadium: Sar-Tov Stadium; Attendance: 2,000; Referee: Metzler

16 April 1955 11	Maccabi Netanya	1–2	Hapoel Kfar Saba	Netanya
	Y. Spiegel 25'	Report (p. 8)	20' H. Glazer; 40' Bonin	Stadium: Sar-Tov Stadium; Attendance: 2,500; Referee: N. Cohen

23 April 1955 12	Hapoel Ramat Gan	0–3	Maccabi Netanya	Givatayim
		Report (p. 8)	33', 67' H. Meller; 78' M. Cohen	Stadium: HaMakhtesh Stadium; Attendance: 2,000; Referee: Scheindling

30 April 1955 13	Maccabi Netanya	3–2	Beitar Jerusalem	Netanya
	M. Cohen 38', 75'; H. Meller 62'	Report (p. 8)	80' Zion; 82' (pen.) Stern	Stadium: Sar-Tov Stadium; Attendance: 3,000; Referee: Frizner

14 May 1955 14	Maccabi Netanya	2–2	Maccabi Tel Aviv	Netanya
	M. Cohen 10'; I. Caspi 75'	Report (p. 8)	3', 62' Glazer	Stadium: Sar-Tov Stadium; Attendance: 3,000; Referee: Levinger

21 May 1955 15	Maccabi Netanya	3–1	Beitar Tel Aviv	Netanya
	Meller 12', 26'; I. Caspi 22'	Report (p. 8)	80' Elmaliah	Stadium: Sar-Tov Stadium; Attendance: 4,000; Referee: Scheindling

4 June 1955 16	Maccabi Haifa	6–2	Maccabi Netanya	Haifa
	Hardy 6'; Tenenbaum 47'; Ben-Tzvi 52' (pen.); Held 54'; Georgiou 74'; Fuchs 80'	Report	44' M. Cohen; 55' Meller	Stadium: Kiryat Haim Stadium; Attendance: 3,500; Referee: Rosenbaum

11 June 1955 17	Hapoel Petah Tikva	1–1	Maccabi Netanya	Petah Tikva
	Stelmach 82'	Report (p. 8)	22' I. Caspi	Stadium: Hapoel Ground; Attendance: 1,500; Referee: Scheindling

19 June 1955 18	Hapoel Hadera	0–1	Maccabi Netanya	Hadera
		Report (p. 8)	59' H. Meller	Stadium: Hapoel Ground; Attendance: 1,500; Referee: Ben-Rubi

26 June 1955 19	Maccabi Netanya	6–1	Hapoel Balfouria	Netanya
	H. Meller 15'; Y. Spiegel 52', 84'; I. Caspi 61' (pen.); M. Cohen 80', 85'	Report (p. 8)	90' Zahavi	Stadium: Sar-Tov Stadium; Attendance: 1,500; Referee: Metzler

3 July 1955 20	Hapoel Haifa	1–1	Maccabi Netanya	Haifa
	Gillerman 47'	Report (p. 8)	70' Spiegel	Stadium: Kiryat Haim Stadium; Attendance: 2,500; Referee: Sher

==== Results by match ====
Match	1	2	3	4	5	6	7	8	9	10	11	12	13	14	15	16	17	18	19	20
Result	L	L	D	L	L	W	D	W	D	D	L	W	W	D	W	L	D	W	W	D
Position	9	11	13	14	13	13	12	10	10	8	10	8	7	7	7	8	8	7	7	7

Updated to match(es) played on 3 July 1955. Source: 2 Dear Points
W = Win; D = Draw; L = Loss

=== State Cup ===
26 March 1955 Round 3	Maccabi Netanya	2–1	S.C. Atlit	Netanya
	M. Cohen 8', 27'		Shapira 21' (pen.)	Stadium: Sar-Tov Stadium; Attendance: 400; Referee: Klein

28 May 1955 Round 4	Hapoel Ramat Gan	2–1	Maccabi Netanya	Givatayim
	Y. Spiegel 39' (o.g.); Chronsich 86'		11' (pen.) I. Caspi	Stadium: HaMakhtesh Stadium; Attendance: 1,500; Referee: Harap
