= 1954–55 Maccabi Rehovot F.C. season =

Maccabi Rehovot
1954–55 season
- Manager: Moshe Litvak
- Stadium: Maccabi Ground, Rehovot
- Liga Alef: not completed
- State Cup: Round 3
- Top goalscorer: League: Moshe Litvak (11); All: Moshe Litvak (12)

The 1954–55 Maccabi Rehovot season was the club's 44th season since its establishment in 1912, and 7th since the establishment of the State of Israel.

During the season, the club competed in Liga Alef (top division) and the State Cup.

== Match Results ==
=== Legend ===
Win Draw Loss

=== Liga Alef ===
League matches began on 6 February 1955, and by the time the season, only 20 rounds of matches were completed, delaying the end of the league season to the next season.

==== League table (as of 2 July 1955) ====
Pos	Club	P	W	D	L	GF	GA	GR	Pts
7	Maccabi Netanya	20	7	7	6	39	39	1.00	21
8	Hapoel Kfar Saba	20	6	6	8	29	30	0.97	18
9	Maccabi Rehovot	20	7	4	9	35	37	0.95	18
10	Hapoel Haifa	20	6	6	8	31	35	0.89	18
11	Hapoel Ramat Gan	20	7	3	10	23	27	0.85	17

==== Matches ====
5 February 1955 1	Maccabi Rehovot	6–1	Hapoel Balfouria	Rehovot
	Litvak 18', 65'; Vider 70', 78'; Shrager 80', 82'	Report (p. 8)	47' Tal	Stadium: Maccabi Ground; Attendance: 600; Referee: Rosenbaum

12 February 1955 2	Maccabi Rehovot	2–3	Hapoel Haifa	Rehovot
	Melamed 12'; Vider 38'	Report (p. 8)	21' Diamant; 35', 52' M. Simantiris	Stadium: Maccabi Ground; Attendance: 1,800; Referee: Zahavi

19 February 1955 3	Beitar Jerusalem	4–3	Maccabi Rehovot	Jerusalem
	Yehezkel 16', 36'; Elfasi 42', 78'	Report (p. 8)	14', 43' Litvak; 28' Steuermann	Stadium: YMCA Stadium; Attendance: 5,000; Referee: Werner

26 February 1955 4	Maccabi Rehovot	1–4	Hapoel Tel Aviv	Rehovot
	Vider 23'	Report (p. 8)	39' D. Goldstein; 42' (pen.), 51' (pen.) Balut; 66' Alaluf	Stadium: Maccabi Ground; Attendance: 1,500; Referee: Scheinhaus

5 March 1955 5	Maccabi Rehovot	1–0	Maccabi Petah Tikva	Rehovot
	Vider 28'	Report (p. 8)		Stadium: Maccabi Ground; Attendance: 1,500; Referee: G. Cohen

12 March 1955 6	Hapoel Kfar Saba	2–2	Maccabi Rehovot	Kfar Saba
	Meirman 12'; Avrutski 86'	Report (p. 8)	25' Steuermann; 89' Stein	Stadium: Hapoel Ground; Attendance: 1,000; Referee: Markovich

19 March 1955 7	Hapoel Ramat Gan	0–0	Maccabi Rehovot	Givatayim
		Report (p. 8)		Stadium: HaMakhtesh Stadium; Attendance: 2,000; Referee: Rosenbaum

2 April 1955 8	Maccabi Rehovot	0–1	Maccabi Netanya	Rehovot
			Hosias	Stadium: Maccabi Ground

9 April 1955 9	Maccabi Tel Aviv	2–1	Maccabi Rehovot	Tel Aviv
	Glazer 25'; Studinski 42'	Report (p. 8)	46' Steuermann	Stadium: Basa Stadium; Attendance: 2,500; Referee: Levinger

13 April 1955 10	Maccabi Rehovot	2–7	Beitar Tel Aviv	Rehovot
	Shrager 25'; Kofman 82'	Report (p. 4)	23' (pen.), 55' (pen.), 74', 89' Huli; 52', 62' (pen.) Elmaliah; 70' Bar-Zion	Stadium: Maccabi Ground; Attendance: 1,500; Referee: Fried

16 April 1955 11	Maccabi Haifa	4–0	Maccabi Rehovot	Haifa
	Hardy 6', 44'; Tenenbaum 8'; Held 53'	Report (p. 8)		Stadium: Kiryat Haim Stadium; Attendance: 2,500; Referee: Moshe Cohen

23 April 1955 12	Maccabi Rehovot	1–3	Hapoel Petah Tikva	Rehovot
	Jamil 35'	Report (p. 8)	11' Kofman; 36' Stelmach; 64' (o.g.) Melamed	Stadium: Maccabi Ground; Attendance: 2,000; Referee: Dudkevich

30 April 1955 13	Hapoel Hadera	4–2	Maccabi Rehovot	Hadera
	Weissberg 1', 21', 75'; Salomon 40'	Report (p. 8)	43' (pen.) Litvak; 69' Herschkovitz	Stadium: Hapoel Ground; Attendance: 2,000; Referee: Levinger

14 May 1955 14	Hapoel Balfouria	0–1	Maccabi Rehovot	Afula
			57' Schmilovich	Stadium: Hapoel Ground; Attendance: 1,000; Referee: Scheindling

21 May 1955 15	Hapoel Haifa	1–1	Maccabi Rehovot	Haifa
	Gillerman 6'	Report (p. 8)	22' Schmilovich	Stadium: Kiryat Haim Stadium; Referee: Metzler

4 June 1955 16	Maccabi Rehovot	4–0	Beitar Jerusalem	Rehovot
	Litvak 22', 53' (pen.); Vider 49'; Schmilovich 81'	Report (p. 8)		Stadium: Maccabi Ground; Attendance: 1,200; Referee: Zahavi

11 June 1955 17	Hapoel Tel Aviv	1–1	Maccabi Rehovot	Tel Aviv
	Rosenbaum 10'	Report (p. 8)	25' Litvak	Stadium: Basa Stadium; Attendance: 5,000; Referee: Yonas

18 June 1955 18	Maccabi Petah Tikva	0–2	Maccabi Rehovot	Petah Tikva
		Report (p. 8)	2' Litvak; 19' Shrager	Stadium: Maccabi Ground; Attendance: 1,500; Referee: Scheindling

26 June 1955 19	Maccabi Rehovot	4–0	Hapoel Kfar Saba	Rehovot
	Shrager 42', 81'; Litvak 55', 59'	Report (p. 8)		Stadium: Maccabi Ground; Attendance: 1,500; Referee: N. Cohen

3 July 1955 20	Maccabi Rehovot	1–0	Hapoel Ramat Gan	Rehovot
	Litvak 64'	Report (p. 8)		Stadium: Maccabi Ground; Attendance: 1,600; Referee: Werner

==== Results by match ====
Match	1	2	3	4	5	6	7	8	9	10	11	12	13	14	15	16	17	18	19	20
Result	W	L	L	L	W	D	D	L	L	L	L	L	L	W	D	W	D	W	W	W
Position	6	7	8	10	9	9	8	9	11	12	13	13	13	13	13	13	13	11	11	9

Updated to match(es) played on 3 July 1955. Source: 2 Dear Points
W = Win; D = Draw; L = Loss

=== State Cup ===
26 March 1955 Round 3	Maccabi Rehovot	1–2	Beitar Tel Aviv	Rehovot
	Litvak 39'		18' Huli; 20' Elmaliah	Stadium: Maccabi Ground; Attendance: 1,000; Referee: Moshe Cohen
