= 1958–59 Liga Alef =

Israeli football season

The 1958–59 Liga Alef season saw Bnei Yehuda win the title and promotion to Liga Leumit.

== Final table ==
Pos	Team	Pld	W	D	L	GF	GA	GD	Pts	Promotion or qualification
1	Bnei Yehuda	22	14	6	2	49	15	+34	34	Promoted to Liga Leumit
2	Hapoel Kiryat Haim	22	11	6	5	33	20	+13	28	
3	Hakoah Tel Aviv	22	11	4	7	24	23	+1	26	
4	Beitar Jerusalem	22	10	6	6	40	36	+4	26	
5	Maccabi Hadera	22	9	5	8	30	32	−2	23	
6	Hapoel Rehovot	22	9	3	10	32	33	−1	21	
7	Hapoel Mahane Yehuda	22	9	2	11	28	35	−7	20	
8	Hapoel Hadera	22	8	3	11	33	33	0	19	
9	Maccabi Rehovot	22	7	5	10	26	32	−6	19	
10	Shimshon Tel Aviv	22	8	3	11	19	29	−10	19	
11	Maccabi Sha'arayim	22	5	1	16	33	40	−7	11	Relegation play-offs
12	Hapoel Afula	22	5	1	16	20	44	−24	11	Relegation play-offs

== Relegation play-offs ==
A promotion-relegation play-off between the 11th and 12th placed clubs in Liga Alef, Maccabi Sha'arayim and Hapoel Afula, and the second placed clubs of the regional divisions of Liga Bet, Hapoel Netanya and Hapoel Be'er Sheva. Each club played the other three once.

30 May 1959	Hapoel Afula	5–0	Hapoel Be'er Sheva	Hapoel Hadera Stadium
	Langbord 5', 10'; Singel 19', 44'; Tenenboim 23'			Attendance: 3,000; Referee: Hoze

30 May 1959	Maccabi Sha'arayim	1–1	Hapoel Netanya	Hapoel Ground, Petah Tikva
	Mizrahi 35'		80' Mali'ach	Attendance: 1,000; Referee: Ashkenazi

6 June 1959	Hapoel Afula	3–1	Hapoel Netanya	Maccabi Jaffa Stadium
	Langbord 20'; Farkas 46'; Singel 64'		3' Orenstein	Attendance: 1,500; Referee: Uziel

6 June 1959	Maccabi Sha'arayim	0–2	Hapoel Be'er Sheva	HaMakhtesh Stadium
			20' Bitton; 70' Kofman	Attendance: 2,000; Referee: Zohar

13 June 1959	Hapoel Afula	6–0	Maccabi Sha'arayim	Hapoel Kfar Saba Ground
	Singel 20', 85'; Tenenboim 47'; Katz 52'; Farkas 75'; Tal 88'			Attendance: 600; Referee: Schleifer

13 June 1959	Hapoel Netanya	1–2	Hapoel Be'er Sheva	Maccabi Rehovot Ground
	Gueta 5'		22' Fridman; 36' Markus	Attendance: 3,500; Referee: Ben-Rubi

Shortly after the Relegation play-offs, as Hapoel Netanya appealed the fielding of Hapoel Afula player Zvi Singel, and the three matches which were played by Hapoel Afula were given as a walkover win to the opposition, as the disciplinary tribunal determined that Singel was registered with Hapoel Beit HaShita and was not properly transferred to Hapoel Afula. Hapoel Afula appealed the decision, but the appeal was denied and, as a result, Hapoel Afula were relegated to Liga Bet and Hapoel Netanya took their place in Liga Alef

Pos	Team	Pld	W	D	L	GF	GA	GD	Pts	Promotion or relegation
1	Hapoel Be'er Sheva	3	3	0	0	7	1	+6	6	Promoted to Liga Alef
2	Hapoel Netanya	3	1	1	1	5	3	+2	3	Promoted to Liga Alef
3	Maccabi Sha'arayim	3	1	1	1	4	3	+1	3	Relegated to Liga Bet
4	Hapoel Afula	3	0	0	3	0	9	−9	0	Disqualified, relegated to Liga Bet
