= Israeli 10th Anniversary Cup =

1958 10th Anniversary Cup
Tournament details
- Country: Israel

Final positions
- Champions: Hapoel Haifa (Leumit); Hapoel Tiberias (Liga Alef)
- Runners-up: Hapoel Jerusalem (Leumit); Hapoel Be'er Sheva (Liga Alef)

Tournament statistics
- Matches played: 17
- Goals scored: 48 (2.82 per match)

The 10th Anniversary Cup (Hebrew: גביע העשור, Gvia HaAsor) was a stand-alone cup competition played to celebrate the 10th anniversary of the Israeli Declaration of Independence.

The competition was split to two, the top competition played by the 12 1957–58 Liga Leumit clubs, with 4 clubs from 1957–58 Liga Alef. The other 8 Liga Alef clubs, along with 8 1957–58 Liga Bet clubs took part in a minor cup tournament titled The FA Cup (Hebrew: גביע ההתאחדות, Gvia HaHit’ahchadut). The two competitions were played as a knock-out tournament.

== Gvia HaAsor ==
=== First round ===
All matches were played on 11 October 1958, with replays being played a week later.

Home team	Score	Away team
Maccabi Tel Aviv	1–4	Hapoel Haifa
Hapoel Tel Aviv	1–0	Maccabi Jaffa
Maccabi Netanya	2–0 (Note: The match originally was abandoned at the 107th minute with Maccabi Netanya leading 3–2., and was replayed.)	Hapoel Petah Tikva
Beitar Tel Aviv	3–1	Beitar Jerusalem
Hapoel Jerusalem	1–1 (a.e.t.)	Bnei Yehuda Tel Aviv
Maccabi Petah Tikva	2–1 (a.e.t.)	Hapoel Mahane Yehuda
Hapoel Kfar Saba	1–2	Maccabi Haifa
Shimshon Tel Aviv	1–1	Hapoel Ramat Gan

==== Replays ====
Home team	Score	Away team
Bnei Yehuda Tel Aviv	0–1	Hapoel Jerusalem
Hapoel Ramat Gan	1–2	Shimshon Tel Aviv

=== Quarter-finals ===
All matches were played on 25 October 1958, with a replay being held on 29 October 1958.

Home team	Score	Away team
Hapoel Haifa	1–1 (a.e.t.)	Beitar Tel Aviv
Maccabi Petah Tikva	w/o (Note: The match was abandoned at the 81st minute, with the result of 2–2, after Hapoel Tel Aviv players attacked the referee. The match was Given to Maccabi Petah Tikva.)	Hapoel Tel Aviv
Maccabi Netanya	0–1	Maccabi Haifa
Shimshon Tel Aviv	0–4	Hapoel Jerusalem

==== Replay ====
Home team	Score	Away team
Beitar Tel Aviv	1–4	Hapoel Haifa

=== Semi-finals ===
Both matches were played in neutral grounds on 1 November 1958.

Home team	Score	Away team
Hapoel Jerusalem	3–0	Maccabi Haifa
Hapoel Haifa	5–0	Maccabi Petah Tikva

=== Final ===
8 November 1958

Hapoel Jerusalem	0–2	Hapoel Haifa
	Maariv; Davar	Ashkenazi 69', 72'

Basa Stadium, Tel Aviv
Attendance: 12,000
Referee: Dudai

== Gvia HaHit'achadut ==
=== First round ===
The draw for the first round was held on 1 October 1958. All matches were played on 11 October 1958.

Home team	Score	Away team
Hapoel Kfar Ata	w/o	Hapoel Tirat HaCarmel
Hapoel Kiryat Haim	3–0	Maccabi Rehovot
Hapoel Holon	w/o	Hapoel Netanya
Hapoel Rehovot	3–1	Hapoel Afula
Hapoel Be'er Sheva	4–1	Hakoah Tel Aviv
Hapoel Hadera	2–0	Hapoel Ramla
Hapoel Tiberias	3–1	Maccabi Sha'arayim
Maccabi Hadera	2–1	Maccabi Ramat Gan

=== Quarter-finals ===
Matches were played on 18 October 1958.

Home team	Score	Away team
Hapoel Be'er Sheva	2–1	Hapoel Hadera
Hapoel Holon	2–1	Hapoel Kfar Ata
Hapoel Tiberias	5–3	Hapoel Kiryat Haim
Hapoel Rehovot	1–0	Maccabi Hadera

=== Semi-finals ===
Both matches were played in neutral grounds on 25 October 1958. The match between Hapoel Be'er Sheva and Hapoel Holon has ended in a draw after 90 minutes, and due to crowd troubles extra-time was not played. A replay was played on 8 November 1958 in Hadera behind closed doors, and a second replay in Jerusalem on 12 November 1958.

Home team	Score	Away team
Hapoel Be'er Sheva	2–2	Hapoel Holon
Hapoel Tiberias	6–4 (a.e.t.)	Hapoel Rehovot

==== Replay ====
Home team	Score	Away team
Hapoel Be'er Sheva	1–1 (a.e.t.)	Hapoel Holon

==== Second Replay ====
Home team	Score	Away team
Hapoel Be'er Sheva	3–1	Hapoel Holon

=== Final ===
15 November 1958

Hapoel Tiberias	7–1	Hapoel Be'er Sheva
Sidin 31'; Nizri 33', 41', 61'; I. Faraj 63'; M. Faraj 78', 80'	Davar	Saban 26'

Basa Stadium, Tel Aviv
Attendance: 4,000
Referee: Handwerk
