= 1956–57 Liga Leumit =

Liga Leumit
- Season: 1956–57
- Champions: Hapoel Tel Aviv; 5th title
- Matches played: 90
- Goals scored: 293 (3.26 per match)

The 1956–57 Liga Leumit season lasted from December 1956 until April 1957. Hapoel Tel Aviv won the title, the club's first championship since independence in 1949.

No clubs were relegated as the league was expanded from ten to twelve clubs for the following season. The top five clubs from Liga Alef entered the promotion play-offs, resulting in Hapoel Kfar Saba and Hapoel Jerusalem being promoted.

== Final table ==
Pos	Team	Pld	W	D	L	GF	GA	GR	Pts	Qualification
1	Hapoel Tel Aviv	18	13	2	3	41	19	2.158	28	Champions
2	Hapoel Petah Tikva	18	10	4	4	42	25	1.680	24	
3	Maccabi Tel Aviv	18	10	3	5	36	20	1.800	23	
4	Maccabi Petah Tikva	18	8	5	5	27	26	1.038	21	
5	Maccabi Haifa	18	8	3	7	34	27	1.259	19	
6	Beitar Tel Aviv	18	6	3	9	29	40	0.725	15	
7	Maccabi Netanya	18	5	4	9	20	27	0.741	14	
8	Hapoel Haifa	18	7	0	11	22	38	0.579	14	
9	Hapoel Ramat Gan	18	4	4	10	23	32	0.719	12	
10	Maccabi Jaffa	18	4	2	12	19	39	0.487	10	Relegation Playoffs

Source: Davar, 14 April 1957

== Results ==
Home \ Away	BTA	HHA	HPT	HRG	HTA	MHA	MJA	MNE	MPT	MTA
Beitar Tel Aviv	—	3–2	2–1	2–2	3–5	4–0	1–0	6–1	1–1	2–0
Hapoel Haifa	4–1	—	0–7	1–0	0–4	0–1	0–2	3–0	1–0	1–0
Hapoel Petah Tikva	4–1	4–2	—	5–2	1–0	2–2	2–0	1–1	1–2	3–2
Hapoel Ramat Gan	1–0	1–3	1–2	—	0–1	1–1	3–3	2–0	1–0	0–0
Hapoel Tel Aviv	3–0	2–0	1–1	3–2	—	3–2	4–0	2–0	1–1	4–2
Maccabi Haifa	3–0	1–4	4–0	2–1	2–3	—	5–0	1–1	4–0	1–3
Maccabi Jaffa	4–1	3–1	1–2	2–3	0–1	0–2	—	0–3	2–2	0–3
Maccabi Netanya	3–0	2–0	0–0	2–1	1–4	1–2	3–0	—	0–1	1–1
Maccabi Petah Tikva	2–2	4–0	1–6	3–1	2–0	1–0	0–1	2–1	—	2–2
Maccabi Tel Aviv	4–0	3–0	3–0	2–1	2–0	3–1	3–1	1–0	2–3	—

Legend: Blue = home team win; Yellow = draw; Red = away team win.

== Promotion play-offs ==
Due to irregularities during the 1956–57 Liga Alef season, an IFA committee decided to hold a promotion play-off between the top five clubs in Liga Alef at the end of the season. Each team played the other four once at a neutral venue. The top two clubs were to be promoted and the third would play a promotion/relegation play-off against Maccabi Jaffa.

Matches were played initially during September, but Maccabi Rehovot, who had finished the season in the second place and had expected to be promoted, declined to participate and appealed the committee's decision. The results of Rehovot's matches were initially recorded as 0-3 technical losses. However, after their appeal was rejected, the club were allowed to replay their matches.

Pos	Team	Pld	W	D	L	GF	GA	GR	Pts	Promotion or qualification
1	Hapoel Kfar Saba	3	2	1	0	7	3	2.333	5	Promoted to Liga Leumit
2	Hapoel Jerusalem	4	1	2	1	4	3	1.333	4	Promoted to Liga Leumit
3	Hapoel Hadera	4	1	2	1	4	4	1.000	4	Deciding Match
4	Hakoah Tel Aviv	4	1	2	1	4	4	1.000	4	Deciding Match
5	Maccabi Rehovot	3	0	1	2	0	5	0.000	1	Remained in Liga Alef

Hapoel Kfar Saba and Hapoel Jerusalem were promoted to Liga Leumit. Hapoel Hadera and Hakoah Tel Aviv were due to play a deciding match to set who will play against Maccabi Jaffa, but Hapoel Hadera declined to participate in protest at the IFA's decision to allow Maccabi Rehovot to replay their games.

=== Promotion and relegation play-offs ===
23 November 1957

Hakoah Tel Aviv	0–2	Maccabi Jaffa
		Arroyo 6'; Ghouhasian 64'

Hapoel Petah Tikva
Attendance: 4,000
Referee: Moshe Cohen
30 November 1957

Maccabi Jaffa	5–0	Hakoah Tel Aviv
Arroyo 29'; Arye 49'; Ghouhasian 64', 73', 89'

Maccabi Jaffa
Attendance: 4,000
