= Hakufsa (disambiguation) =

Hakufsa or HaKufsa, (Hebrew: הקופסא, The Box) may refer to:

- Informal name of the Sar-Tov Stadium, Netanya, Israel
- Hakufsa (Hakol Mushlam), 2002 box set of the Israeli rock band HaClique
- Hakufsa (Shalom Hanoch), 2004 box set of the Israeli singer Shalom Hanoch
