= Moshe Litvak =

Israeli footballer and manager

Moshe Litvak משה ליטבק
Personal information
- Full name: Moshe Mosi Litvak
- Date of birth: 8 March 1926
- Place of birth: Tel Aviv, Mandatory Palestine
- Date of death: March 7, 2012 (aged 85)
- Positions: Forward; defender

Youth career
- 1939–40: Maccabi Rehovot

Senior career*
Years	Team	Apps	(Gls)
1940–1942	Fire Brigade Rehovot		
1942–1944	Maccabi Rehovot		
1944–1945	Maccabi Tel Aviv		
1945–1958	Maccabi Rehovot		

International career
1949–1954	Israel	6	(0)

Managerial career
- 1955–1958: Maccabi Rehovot
- 1958–1960: Hapoel Rehovot
- 1960–1961: Shimshon Tel Aviv
- 1961–1962: Hakoah Tel Aviv
- 1962–1963: Hakoah Maccabi Ramat Gan
- 1963–1964: Hapoel Ramla
- 1964–1965: Hapoel Hadera
- 1965–1966: Hapoel Ramat Gan
- 1966–1968: Hapoel Kiryat Ono
- 1968–1969: Hapoel Lod
- 1969: Hapoel Be'er Sheva
- 1969–1970: Hapoel Jerusalem
- 1970–1972: Hapoel Be'er Sheva
- 1972–1973: Hapoel Marmorek
- 1973–1974: Maccabi Petah Tikva
- * Club domestic league appearances and goals

Moshe Litvak (Hebrew: משה ליטבק) was an Israeli footballer and manager. He is best known for his years at Maccabi Rehovot where he started his managerial career. He also played 6 official matches for the national team between 1949 and 1954.

== Playing career ==
Litvak was born in Rehovot and started playing football with Maccabi Rehovot as a youth. After appearing with Fire Brigade Rehovot in Liga Bet at the age of 14, Litvak returned to Maccabi Rehovot, with whom he played, with an exception of one season, until 1958. In 1955, Litvak took over coaching the team and served as player-manager for the next three years, quitting active play in summer 1958. Between 1949 and 1954, Litvak played in 6 official matches for the football team, mostly playing as defender. Litvak played in the 1950 and 1954 FIFA World Cup qualification campaigns and took part in the national team's tour of South Africa, during which the national team played one official match against the host and 10 further matches in South Africa, Southern Rhodesia, Northern Rhodesia and Mozambique.

== Coaching career ==
Litvak started coaching in 1955, serving as a player-manager Maccabi Rehovot. The club dropped to Liga Alef at the end of the 1955–56 season, and Litvak led the team to a second-place finish at the end of the season, which would have been enough to see the club bounce back to the top division. However, due to suspicions of match-fixing during the season, an IFA committee decided to hold a promotion play-off between the top five clubs at the end of the season. Maccabi Rehovot finished fifth in the play-off and remained in Liga Alef.

After leaving Maccabi Rehovot in summer 1958, Litvak coached a string of teams in Liga Leumit, Liga Alef and Liga Bet, winning Liga Alef with Hakoah Tel Aviv in 1961–62 and Hapoel Be'er Sheva in 1970–71. Litvak's last post as head coach was in Maccabi Petah Tikva, from which he resigned in mid-season.

== Personal life ==
Litvak worked in Bank Leumi, progressing to management position before retiring due to old age. Litvak's son, Muli Litvak, is the owner of Coolvision, which operates several websites, among them ImLive.com.

== Honours ==
- Liga Alef (second division) (2):
  - 1961–62 (with Hakoah Tel Aviv), 1970–71 (with Hapoel Be'er Sheva).
