= 1956–57 Liga Alef =

Liga Alef
- Season: 1956-57
- Champions: Hapoel Kfar Saba
- Matches played: 132
- Goals scored: 457 (3.46 per match)

The 1956–57 Liga Alef season saw Hapoel Kfar Saba win the title. originally, the top two clubs were due to gain promotion to Liga Leumit. However, due to irregularities during the season, an IFA committee decided to hold a promotion play-off between the top five clubs at the end of the season.

== Final table ==
Pos	Team	Pld	W	D	L	GF	GA	GR	Pts	Qualification or relegation
1	Hapoel Kfar Saba	22	16	0	6	62	26	2.385	32	Promotion play-offs
2	Maccabi Rehovot	22	13	4	5	56	19	2.947	30	Promotion play-offs
3	Hapoel Jerusalem	22	12	6	4	47	26	1.808	30	Promotion play-offs
4	Hapoel Hadera	22	11	7	4	42	23	1.826	29	Promotion play-offs
5	Hakoah Tel Aviv	22	8	7	7	41	39	1.051	23	Promotion play-offs
6	Beitar Jerusalem	22	9	4	9	46	36	1.278	22	
7	Hapoel Mahane Yehuda	22	8	6	8	35	30	1.167	22	
8	Hapoel Kiryat Haim	22	8	4	10	27	40	0.675	20	
9	Hapoel Rehovot	22	7	5	10	29	39	0.744	19	
10	Maccabi Sha'arayim	22	7	4	11	24	54	0.444	18	
11	Hapoel Nahariya	22	5	1	16	30	71	0.423	11	Relegated to Liga Bet
12	Maccabi Ramat Gan	22	2	4	16	18	54	0.333	8	Relegated to Liga Bet

Updated to match(es) played on 18 May 1957. Source: HadShot HaSport, 22 May 1957

== Promotion play-offs ==
Each team played the other four once at a neutral venue. The top two clubs were to be promoted and the third would play a promotion/relegation play-off against the bottom club at Liga Leumit, which was Maccabi Jaffa.

Matches were played initially during September, but Maccabi Rehovot, who had finished the season in the second place and had expected to be promoted, declined to participate and appealed the committee's decision. The results of Rehovot's matches were initially recorded as 0-3 technical losses. However, after their appeal was rejected, the club were allowed to replay their matches.

Pos	Team	Pld	W	D	L	GF	GA	GR	Pts	Promotion or qualification
1	Hapoel Kfar Saba	4	3	1	0	10	3	3.333	7	Promoted to Liga Leumit
2	Hapoel Jerusalem	4	1	2	1	4	3	1.333	4	Promoted to Liga Leumit
3	Hapoel Hadera	4	1	2	1	4	4	1.000	4	Deciding Match
4	Hakoah Tel Aviv	4	1	2	1	4	4	1.000	4	Deciding Match
5	Maccabi Rehovot	4	0	1	3	0	8	0.000	1	Remained in Liga Alef

Hapoel Kfar Saba and Hapoel Jerusalem were promoted to Liga Leumit. Hapoel Hadera and Hakoah Tel Aviv were due to play a deciding match to set who will play against Maccabi Jaffa, but Hapoel Hadera declined to participate in protest at the IFA's decision to allow Maccabi Rehovot to replay their games.

=== Promotion and relegation play-offs ===
23 November 1957

Hakoah Tel Aviv	0–2	Maccabi Jaffa
		Arroyo 6'; Ghouhasian 64'

Hapoel Petah Tikva
Attendance: 4,000
Referee: Moshe Cohen
30 November 1957

Maccabi Jaffa	5–0	Hakoah Tel Aviv
Arroyo 29'; Arye 49'; Ghouhasian 64', 73', 89'

Maccabi Jaffa
Attendance: 4,000
