= Ze'ev Casspi =

Israeli footballer (1931–2021)

Ze'ev Casspi זאב כספי
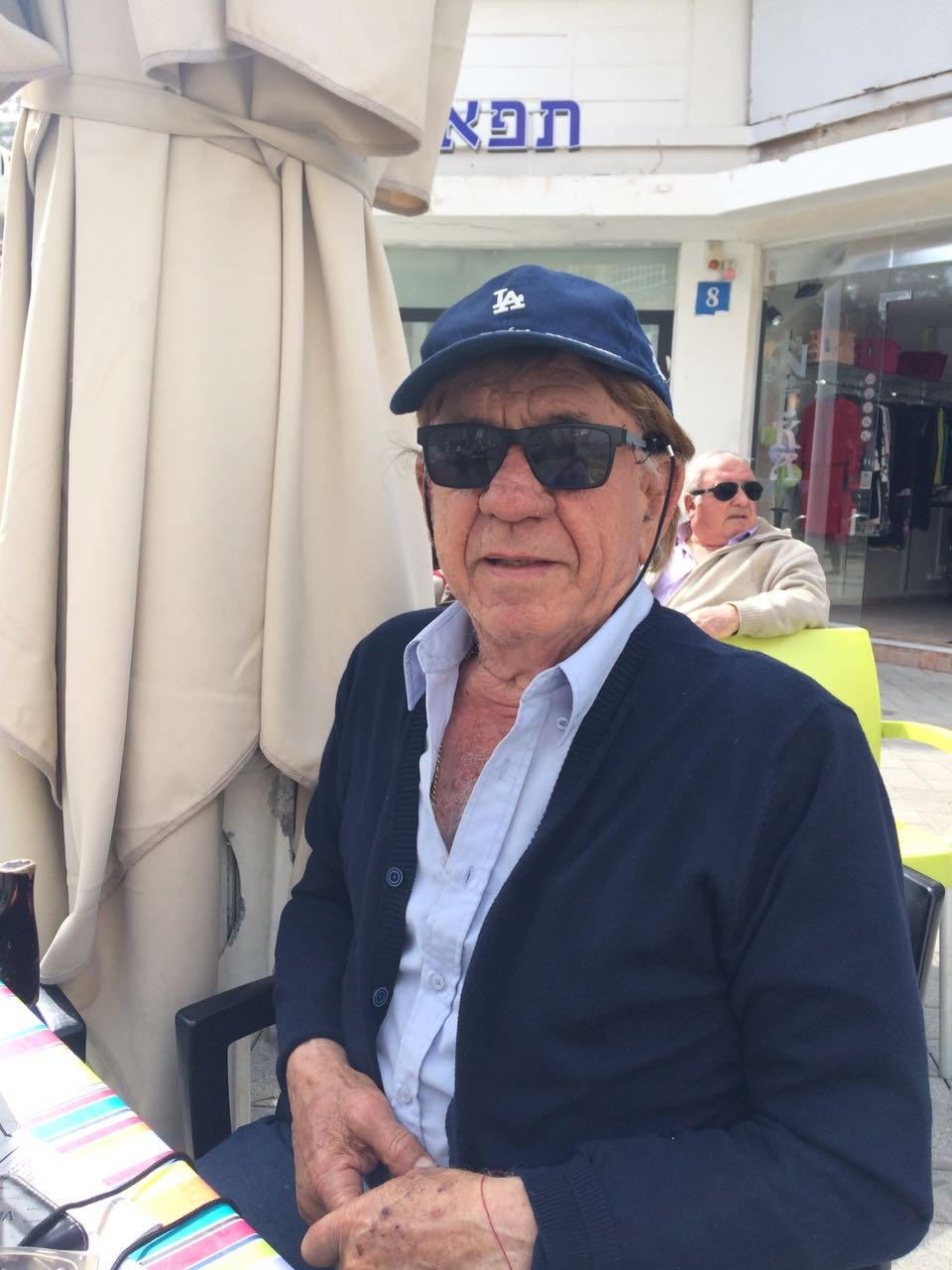

Personal information
- Full name: Ze'ev Casspi
- Date of birth: 1931
- Place of birth: Tiberias, Mandatory Palestine
- Date of death: 2021 (aged 89–90)
- Place of death: Israel
- Height: 1.69 m (5 ft 7 in)
- Position: Goalkeeper

Youth career
- 1945–49: Maccabi Netanya

Senior career*
Years	Team	Apps	(Gls)
1949–69	Maccabi Netanya	325	(0)
1969–70	Beitar Netanya		
- * Club domestic league appearances and goals

Ze'ev Casspi
Personal information
- Years active: 1945–1953
- Height: 1.69 m (5 ft 6 1/2 in)

Sport
- Country: Israel
- Sport: Athletics
- Events: High jump, Javelin, Decathlon
- Club: Hapoel Netanya
- Retired: 1953

Achievements and titles
- Personal bests: Javelin; 52.30 m High Jump; 1.82 m
Medal record
Representing Israel
Maccabiah Games
Gold medal – first place	1950	Javelin
Silver medal – second place	1950	Decathlon
Bronze medal – third place	1950	High Jump
Gold medal – first place	1953	Decathlon
Silver medal – second place	1953	High Jump

Ze'ev Casspi (Hebrew: זאב כספי; 1931-2021) was a former Israeli footballer who played 20 years for Maccabi Netanya. He was the younger brother of Yitzhak Casspi, also a footballer for Netanya.

== Career ==
Casspi was born in Tiberias and moved to Netanya with his family in 1932. While at school, he and his brother Yitzhak were discovered by Jewish sport pioneer Walter Frankl, and Casspi began training in athletics with Hapoel Netanya and in football with Maccabi Netanya.

Casspi represented Israel in the 3rd and 4th Maccabiah Games, winning gold medals in the javelin throw and decathlon, but was forced to retire due to a car accident in 1953. In 1955, after recovering, Casspi returned to play for Maccabi Netanya. He played there until the end of the 1968–69 season, when he moved to Beitar Netanya. He played one season there before retiring from football in fall 1970.

After retirement, Casspi continued to be involved in Maccabi Netanya, serving on its management board and helping to establish the club's handball team.

== Honors ==
- Liga Alef (second tier):
  - 1963–64
