= 1958–59 Liga Bet =

Israeli football season

The 1958–59 Liga Bet season saw Hapoel Tiberias and Hapoel Ramla promoted to Liga Alef as the respective winners of the north and south divisions. They were joined by runners-up, Hapoel Netanya and Hapoel Be'er Sheva, which were promoted after promotion play-offs.

No club relegated, as in the following season, Liga Bet expanded from 24 clubs, divided in two regional divisions, to 64 clubs, divided in four regional divisions.

== North Division ==
Pos	Team	Pld	W	D	L	GF	GA	GD	Pts	Promotion or qualification
1	Hapoel Tiberias	20	–	–	–	82	20	+62	37	Promoted to Liga Alef
2	Hapoel Netanya	21	–	–	–	50	23	+27	30	Promotion play-offs
3	Hapoel Beit Lid	22	–	–	–	44	28	+16	28	
4	Hapoel Acre	22	–	–	–	38	39	−1	24	
5	Hapoel Safed	20	–	–	–	43	38	+5	23	
6	Beitar Netanya	22	–	–	–	45	44	+1	22	
7	Hapoel Tel Hanan	22	–	–	–	40	44	−4	22	
8	Hapoel Nahariya	22	–	–	–	60	51	+9	21	
9	Hapoel Even Yehuda	22	–	–	–	32	62	−30	16	
10	Hapoel Tirat HaCarmel	22	–	–	–	30	51	−21	15	
11	Hapoel Kfar Ata	22	–	–	–	23	54	−31	11	
12	Hapoel Atlit	21	–	–	–	20	53	−33	9	

== South Division ==
Pos	Team	Pld	W	D	L	GF	GA	GD	Pts	Promotion or qualification
1	Hapoel Ramla	22	–	–	–	59	15	+44	35	Promoted to Liga Alef
2	Hapoel Be'er Sheva	22	–	–	–	38	16	+22	33	Promotion play-offs
3	Maccabi Shmuel Tel Aviv	22	–	–	–	52	27	+25	31	
4	SK Nes Tziona	22	–	–	–	37	21	+16	29	
5	Maccabi Ramat Gan	21	–	–	–	40	29	+11	25	
6	Hapoel Holon	21	–	–	–	39	32	+7	25	
7	Maccabi Ramla	22	–	–	–	26	45	−19	20	
8	Hapoel Rishon LeZion	22	–	–	–	33	33	0	17	
9	Hapoel Ra'anana	22	–	–	–	26	41	−15	16	
10	Hapoel Kiryat Ono	22	–	–	–	30	58	−28	14	
11	Beitar Jaffa	22	–	–	–	28	58	−30	9	
12	Beitar Mahane Yehuda	22	–	–	–	16	59	−43	8	

== Promotion play-offs ==
A promotion-relegation play-off between the 11th and 12th placed clubs in Liga Alef, Maccabi Sha'arayim and Hapoel Afula, and the second placed clubs of the regional divisions of Liga Bet, Hapoel Netanya and Hapoel Be'er Sheva. Each club played the other three once.

30 May 1959	Hapoel Afula	5–0	Hapoel Be'er Sheva	Hapoel Hadera Stadium
	Langbord 5', 10'; Singel 19', 44'; Tenenboim 23'			Attendance: 3,000; Referee: Hoze

30 May 1959	Maccabi Sha'arayim	1–1	Hapoel Netanya	Hapoel Ground, Petah Tikva
	Mizrahi 35'		80' Mali'ach	Attendance: 1,000; Referee: Ashkenazi

6 June 1959	Hapoel Afula	3–1	Hapoel Netanya	Maccabi Jaffa Stadium, Tel Aviv
	Langbord 20'; Farkas 46'; Singel 64'		3' Orenstein	Attendance: 1,500; Referee: Uziel

6 June 1959	Maccabi Sha'arayim	0–2	Hapoel Be'er Sheva	HaMakhtesh Stadium
			20' Bitton; 70' Kofman	Attendance: 2,000; Referee: Zohar

13 June 1959	Hapoel Afula	6–0	Maccabi Sha'arayim	Hapoel Kfar Saba Ground
	Singel 20', 85'; Tenenboim 47'; Katz 52'; Farkas 75'; Tal 88'			Attendance: 600; Referee: Schleifer

13 June 1959	Hapoel Netanya	1–2	Hapoel Be'er Sheva	Maccabi Rehovot Ground
	Gueta 5'		22' Fridman; 36' Markus	Attendance: 3,500; Referee: Ben-Rubi

Shortly after the Relegation play-offs, as Hapoel Netanya appealed the fielding of Hapoel Afula player Zvi Singel, and the three matches which were played by Hapoel Afula were given as a walkover win to the opposition, as the disciplinary tribunal determined that Singel was registered with Hapoel Beit HaShita and was not properly transferred to Hapoel Afula. Hapoel Afula appealed the decision, but the appeal was denied and, as a result, Hapoel Afula were relegated to Liga Bet and Hapoel Netanya took their place in Liga Alef

Pos	Team	Pld	W	D	L	GF	GA	GD	Pts	Promotion or relegation
1	Hapoel Be'er Sheva	3	3	0	0	7	1	+6	6	Promoted to Liga Alef
2	Hapoel Netanya	3	1	1	1	5	3	+2	3	Promoted to Liga Alef
3	Maccabi Sha'arayim	3	1	1	1	4	3	+1	3	Relegated to Liga Bet
4	Hapoel Afula	3	0	0	3	0	9	−9	0	Disqualified, relegated to Liga Bet
