= 1956–57 Liga Bet =

Israeli football season

The 1956–57 Liga Bet season saw Hapoel Balfouria and Shimshon Tel Aviv promoted to Liga Alef as the respective winners of the north and south divisions. They were joined by Maccabi Hadera and Bnei Yehuda, who finished second in each of their respective divisions.

== North Division ==
Pos	Team	Pld	W	D	L	GF	GA	GD	Pts	Promotion or relegation
1	Hapoel Balfouria	22	–	–	–	66	23	+43	34	Promoted to Liga Alef
2	Maccabi Hadera	22	–	–	–	58	32	+26	32	Promoted to Liga Alef
3	Hapoel Netanya	22	–	–	–	62	32	+30	31	
4	Hapoel Tiberias	22	–	–	–	62	39	+23	26	
5	Hapoel Acre	22	–	–	–	52	47	+5	24	
6	Hapoel Even Yehuda	22	–	–	–	40	52	−12	22	
7	Hapoel Tirat HaCarmel	22	–	–	–	50	51	−1	20	
8	Hapoel Beit Lid	22	–	–	–	26	46	−20	17	
9	Hapoel Kfar Ata	22	–	–	–	37	59	−22	16	
10	Hapoel Atlit (Note: Sport Club Atlit became Hapoel Atlit.)	22	–	–	–	29	47	−18	15	
11	Hapoel Tel Hanan	22	–	–	–	34	55	−21	14	
12	Maccabi Zikhron Ya'akov	22	–	–	–	29	62	−33	13	Relegated to Liga Gimel

Notes:

Ahva Notzrit Haifa collapsed and withdrew from the league.

== South Division ==
Pos	Team	Pld	W	D	L	GF	GA	GD	Pts	Promotion or relegation
1	Shimshon Tel Aviv	24	–	–	–	79	18	+61	44	Promoted to Liga Alef
2	Bnei Yehuda	24	21	1	2	92	20	+72	43	Promoted to Liga Alef
3	Hapoel Rishon LeZion	24	–	–	–	58	30	+28	32	
4	Hapoel Ramla	24	–	–	–	43	32	+11	27	
5	Hapoel Kiryat Ono	24	–	–	–	52	52	0	25	
6	Maccabi Shmuel Tel Aviv	24	–	–	–	43	47	−4	25	
7	Hapoel Be'er Sheva	24	–	–	–	44	45	−1	24	
8	Maccabi Ramla	24	–	–	–	39	48	−9	22	
9	Beitar Jaffa	24	–	–	–	36	47	−11	20	
10	Hapoel Ra'anana	24	–	–	–	34	44	−10	19	
11	Beitar Mahane Yehuda	24	–	–	–	40	57	−17	19	
12	Hapoel HaMegabesh Rishon LeZion	24	–	–	–	27	70	−43	10	Relegated to Liga Gimel
13	Hapoel Mefalsim Sha'ar HaNegev	24	–	–	–	8	85	−77	2	Relegated to Liga Gimel
