= Alfred Pichler =

The Most Reverend Alfred Pichler
- Bishop of Banja Luka
- Diocese: Banja Luka
- See: Banja Luka
- Appointed: 22 July 1959
- In office: 1959-1989
- Predecessor: Dragutin Čelik
- Successor: Franjo Komarica

Orders
- Ordination: 13 March 1937
- Consecration: 18 October 1959 by Franjo Šeper

Personal details
- Born: 18 December 1913 Drvar, Condominium of Bosnia and Herzegovina, Austria-Hungary
- Died: 17 May 1992 (aged 78) Banja Luka, Bosnia and Herzegovina
- Buried: Cathedral of Saint Bonaventure, Banja Luka, Bosnia and Herzegovina
- Denomination: Catholic
- Parents: Anton Pichler; Matilda Helk
- Motto: Nec laudibus nec timore (Neither praise nor fear)

Alfred Pichler (18 December 1913 – 17 May 1992) was the Roman Catholic Bishop of Banja Luka, the first bishop of Banja Luka who was diocesan priest and the first who was born on the territory of the Diocese of Banja Luka.

== Early life ==
Alfred Pichler was born in Oštrelj near Drvar, Bosnia and Herzegovina, to Anton and Matilda (née Helk) Pichler. He had finished elementary school in Šipovo and Prijedor where he also attended six years of gymnasium, then he went to the minor seminary in Travnik. He continued studying at the University of Catholic Theology in Sarajevo where he was ordained deacon by Ivan Šarić on 20 February 1937.

== Priesthood ==
Pichler was ordained to the priesthood on 13 March 1937 in the Church of Saints Cyril and Methodius in Sarajevo. He first served as a chaplain in Banja Luka, and then as a parish priest in Novi Martinac.

During the Second World War, he had to escape from Chetniks to Bosanski Aleksandrovac. After the war ended, from May 1945 to March in 1946, he was situated with other Germans in a camp in Bosanski Aleksandrovac. He was administrator of parishes in Nova Topola, Bosanski Aleksandrovac and Mahovljani from the autumn 1946 until spring 1952.

Communist authorities accused Pichler of "enemy propaganda" and imprisoned him until April 1954. After his release until the appointment of the bishop, he served as parish priest of Prnjavor.

== Episcopal ministry ==
On 22 July 1959, Pichler was appointed Bishop of Banja Luka by Pope John XXIII. He received his episcopal consecration from Franjo Šeper, with Smiljan Franjo Čekada and Matija Zvekanović serving as co-consecrators on 18 October 1959.

During his episcopal service, Bishop Pichler left a deep mark and he specially devoted himself up to the upbringing and education of priests. Thus, during his ministry, 34 priests were ordained and three priests from his diocese became bishops (Franjo Komarica, Vinko Puljić and Severin Pernek).

He established 9 new parishes: Ravska (1967), Dragalovci (1970), Mariastern (1973), Odžak-Čaić (1975), Raljaš (1977), Trn (1980), Budžak (1983) and Motike (1983). He participated in the Second Vatican Council as a member of the commission for the liturgy. Being the president of the Liturgical board of Yugoslavia he has greatly contributed the restoration of the Roman liturgy after the council. Because he had cordial relationships with local Orthodox Christians, pope John Paul II appointed him member of the International Catholic-Orthodox episcopal commission.

On 15 May 1989, he retired from the ministry and until his death remained bishop emeritus of Banja Luka. He died on 17 May 1992, and was buried two days later at the cathedral.

== Bibliography ==
- Upoznajmo što činimo, Sarajevo-Banja Luka, 1983
- Da budemo sretni, Mostar-Banja Luka, 1985

Catholic Church titles
Preceded by Dragutin Čelik	Bishop of Banja Luka; 1959–1989	Succeeded by Franjo Komarica
