= 1940 Liga Bet =

Israeli football season

The 1940 Liga Bet season was the second-tier league of the Palestine League organized by the EIFA. The league was split into three regional divisions: North, Samaria and South. The Samaria division was won by Degel Zion Tel Aviv, while Hapoel Hadera won the North division and a British military team, RSG, which competed in the league as a guest, won the South Division.

At the end of the season, Degel Zion, Hapoel Hadera and Hapoel Rishon LeZion (who finished as runners-up in the South division) competed for promotions to the top division. Hapoel Rishon leZion and Degel Zion won the two top places and were promoted.

== Regular season results ==
=== North division ===
8 teams competed in the division, with Hapoel Hadera winning the league with a perfect record.

League Clubs:

- Bar Kochva Haifa
- Beitar Haifa
- Hapoel Binyamina
- Hapoel Hadera (division champions; advanced to promotion play-offs)
- Hapoel Kfar Ata
- Maccabi Binyamina
- Maccabi Hadera
- Maccabi Haifa

=== Samaria division ===
Pos	Team	Pld	W	D	L	GF	GA	GR	Pts
1	Degel Zion Tel Aviv	18	13	5	0	53	18	2.944	31
2	Egged Tel Aviv	18	13	1	4	74	25	2.960	27
3	Hapoel Ramat Gan	18	12	2	4	83	34	2.441	26
4	Hapoel Petah Tikva	18	11	3	4	71	32	2.219	25
5	Hakoah Petah Tikva	18	10	1	7	50	42	1.190	21
6	Hapoel Ra'anana	18	6	2	10	34	49	0.694	14
7	Maccabi Netanya	18	5	3	10	31	47	0.660	13
8	Hapoel Netanya	18	5	2	11	29	59	0.492	12
9	Beitar Netanya	18	3	4	11	21	67	0.313	10
10	Maccabi Ramat Gan	18	0	1	17	14	87	0.161	1

=== South division ===
Pos	Team	Pld	W	D	L	GF	GA	GR	Pts
1	RSG Rehovot	14	11	2	1	52	21	2.476	24
2	Hapoel Rishon LeZion	14	10	2	2	38	17	2.235	22
3	Maccabi Rehovot	14	9	2	3	31	20	1.550	20
4	Maccabi Rishon LeZion	14	6	2	6	34	20	1.700	14
5	HaTehiya Tel Aviv	14	6	1	7	27	28	0.964	13
6	Hapoel Rehovot	14	5	1	8	24	39	0.615	11
7	Hegge Tel Aviv	14	4	0	10	10	36	0.278	8
8	Maccabi Gedera	14	0	0	14	9	44	0.205	0

== Promotion play-offs ==
Pos	Team	Pld	W	D	L	GF	GA	GR	Pts		HRL	DZT	HHD
1	Hapoel Rishon LeZion	4	3	1	0	8	3	2.667	7	Promotion to Liga Alef	—	2–1	1–1
2	Degel Zion Tel Aviv	4	2	0	2	10	5	2.000	4	Promotion to Liga Alef	1–2	—	4–1
3	Hapoel Hadera	4	0	1	3	2	12	0.167	1		0–3	0–4	—

Updated to match(es) played on 18 August 1940. Source: 100 Years of Football 1906-2006, Elisha Shohat (Israel), 2006
