= 1957–58 Liga Bet =

Israeli football season

The 1957–58 Liga Bet season saw Hapoel Tiberias and Hapoel Ramla win their respective regional divisions. However, there was no promotion to Liga Alef or relegation to Liga Gimel, after the Israel Football Association decided to abandon the league before the end of the season, due to suspicions of bribery.

== North Division ==
Pos	Team	Pld	W	D	L	GF	GA	GD	Pts
1	Hapoel Tiberias	21	–	–	–	52	32	+20	31
2	Hapoel Tirat HaCarmel	21	–	–	–	54	35	+19	29
3	Hapoel Netanya	19	–	–	–	47	37	+10	25
4	Hapoel Tel Hanan	21	–	–	–	44	37	+7	20
5	Hapoel Kfar Ata	20	–	–	–	39	33	+6	20
6	Hapoel Safed	19	–	–	–	46	47	−1	20
7	Beitar Netanya	20	–	–	–	39	35	+4	19
8	Hapoel Beit Lid	18	–	–	–	21	23	−2	18
9	Hapoel Acre	21	–	–	–	33	39	−6	17
10	Hapoel Nahariya	20	–	–	–	43	58	−15	15
11	Hapoel Atlit	21	–	–	–	29	45	−16	15
12	Hapoel Even Yehuda	21	–	–	–	21	55	−34	13

== South Division ==
Pos	Team	Pld	W	D	L	GF	GA	GD	Pts
1	Hapoel Ramla	21	–	–	–	56	20	+36	34
2	Hapoel Be'er Sheva	21	–	–	–	50	12	+38	32
3	Hapoel Holon	20	–	–	–	52	17	+35	30
4	Maccabi Ramat Gan	21	–	–	–	53	26	+27	26
5	Hapoel Rishon LeZion	20	–	–	–	39	33	+6	22
6	Hapoel Kiryat Ono	21	–	–	–	38	31	+7	21
7	Maccabi Ramla	19	–	–	–	29	40	−11	19
8	Maccabi Shmuel Tel Aviv	20	–	–	–	31	35	−4	18
9	SK Nes Tziona	21	–	–	–	31	38	−7	18
10	Hapoel Ra'anana	21	–	–	–	33	30	+3	16
11	Beitar Mahane Yehuda	20	–	–	–	15	62	−47	9
12	Beitar Jaffa	21	–	–	–	13	96	−83	1

== See also ==
- 1957–58 Liga Alef
