= Hapoel Tiberias F.C. =

Defunct association football club in Israel

Hapoel Tiberias
- Full name: Hapoel Tiberias Football Club מועדון כדורגל הפועל טבריה
- Founded: 1935
- Dissolved: 1994
- Ground: Municipal Stadium, Tiberias
Home colours	Away colours

Hapoel Tiberias (Hebrew: הפועל טבריה) was a football club from Tiberias, Israel. The club spent several seasons in the top division of Israeli football in the 1970s, making one additional appearance in the top flight in 1988 before relegating back to the lower leagues and dissolving.

== History ==
The earliest documented match by the club was played in May 1929 against members of Hashomer Hatzair group that lived in Kvutzat Kinneret, which later became Hapoel Afikim. Hapoel Tiberias lost the match 0–1. During the British Mandate The team competed in the northern district of the second division of the Palestine League, as well as in local competitions.

After the Israeli Declaration of Independence, the club was re-established in 1953, and played for several years in Liga Gimel, before gaining promotion to Liga Bet. At the end of 1958–59 season, the club finished top of Liga Bet, North Division and was promoted to Liga Alef. During this period, the club competed in Gvia HaHit'achadut, a cup competition dedicated to the 10th anniversary of Israel, and won the cup, beating Hapoel Be'er Sheva 7–1 in the final.

In their first season in the top flight they finished third, with Yitzhak Nizri being joint top scorer with 16 goals. After two seasons of mid-table finishes, Hapoel ended the 1964–65 season bottom of the table, and were relegated to Liga Alef.

The Club remained in the lower leagues until 1987–88, when they returned to Liga Leumit. However, they finished third from bottom in 1988–89 and made an immediate return to the second tier. Financial difficulties caused the club to drop to Liga Alef, and being demoted to Liga Gimel.

== Honours ==
=== League ===
Honour	No.	Years
Second Tier	1	1960–61
Third Tier	4	1957–58, 1958–59, 1977–78, 1983–84
Fourth tier	2	1955–56, 1976–77

=== Cup competitions ===
Honour	No.	Years
10th Anniversary Cup (second tier)	1	1958
Liga Alef (third tier) Super Cup	1	1984
