= David Kushnir =

Israeli long jumper (1931–2020)

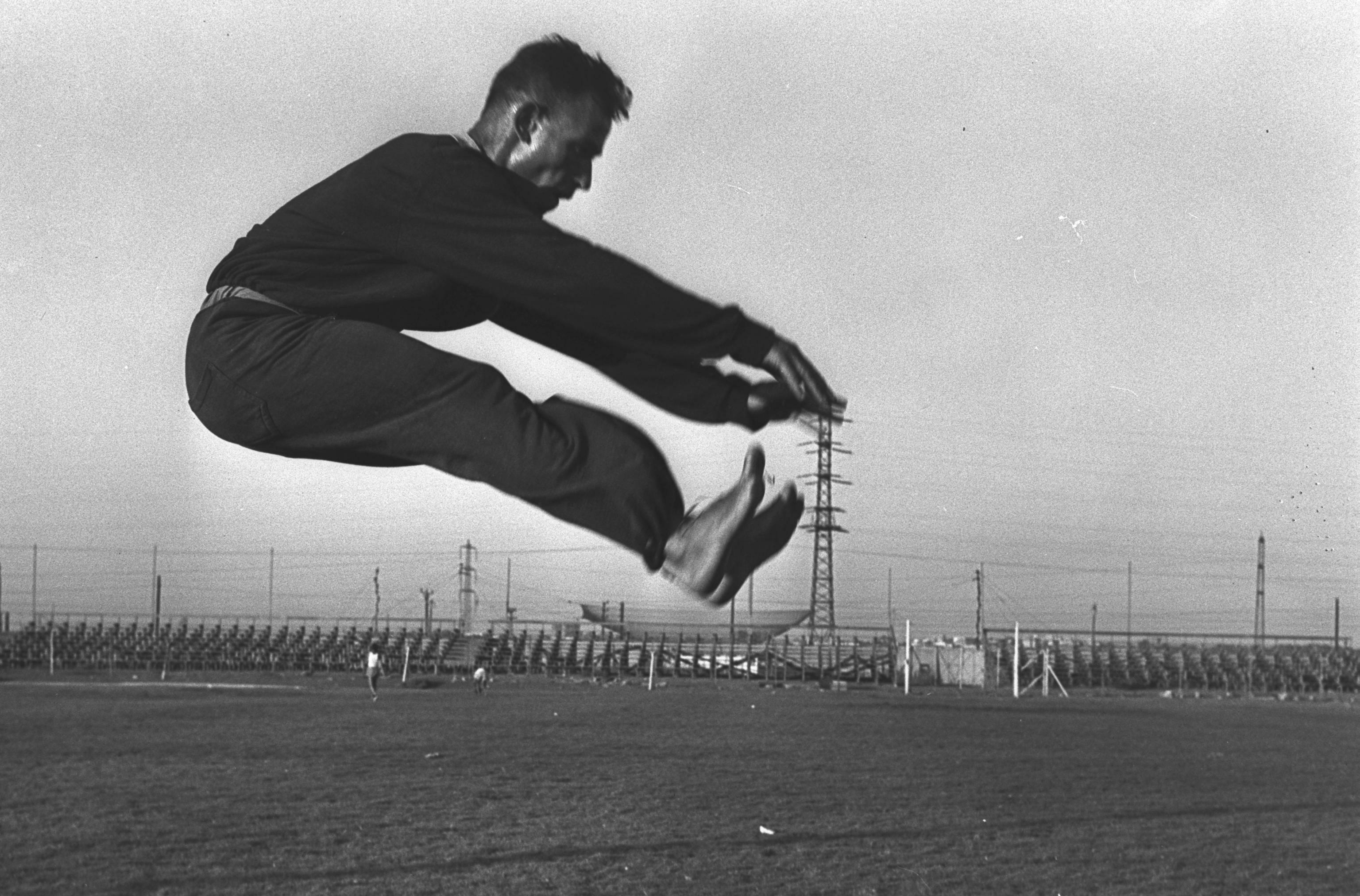
- David Kushnir in 1960

Personal information
- Native name: דוד קושניר
- Born: June 21, 1931 Afula, Mandatory Palestine (now Israel)
- Died: October 18, 2020 (aged 89)
- Height: 5 ft 8 in (173 cm)
- Weight: 163 lb (74 kg)

Sport
- Event: broad jump (also known as the long jump)
- Updated on 26 August 2016

David Kushnir (Hebrew: דוד קושניר; J21 June 1931 – 18 October 2020) was an Israeli Olympic long-jumper and track and field coach.

He was born in Afula, Mandatory Palestine (now in Israel), and was Jewish. When Kushnir competed in the Olympics he was 5 feet 8 inches (173 cm) tall and weighed 163 pounds (74 kg).

== Track and field career ==
Kushnir won the gold medal in the broad jump (also known as the long jump) at the 1953 Maccabiah Games.

He competed for Israel at the 1956 Summer Olympics, at the age of 25, in Melbourne, Australia in the Men's Long Jump, jumped a distance of 6.89 meters, but did not qualify for the finals, and came in 25th.

Kushnir won the gold medal in the broad jump at the 1957 Maccabiah Games.

Kushnir also competed for Israel at the 1960 Summer Olympics, at the age of 29, in Rome, Italy, in the Men's Long Jump, jumped 7.20 meters, and came in 25th.

He won the Israeli Championship in the long jump in 1960, 1961, 1963, and 1964. Kushnir coached the Israeli national track and field team from 1970 to 1982. At the 1978 World Veterans Championship (age 40–45), Kushnir won the broad jump.

On top of being Israeli champion and national record holder in the long jump, Kushnir also won national championships in 100 metres, triple jump, and pole vault. He was the national record holder in triple jump (1954, 5 years) and decathlon (1954, 6 years).

== Football career ==
Kushnir played football for Hapoel Balfouria while the club played in the top division, scoring goals for the club in matches against Maccabi Netanya and Hapoel Hadera during the 1954–55 season.

== After retirement ==
After his retirement, Kushnir moved into track and field coaching. His most prominent trainee was long jumper and triple jumper Rogel Nachum.
