= Edmond Schmilovich =

Romanian-Israeli footballer and manager

Edmond Schmilovich אדמונד שמילוביץ
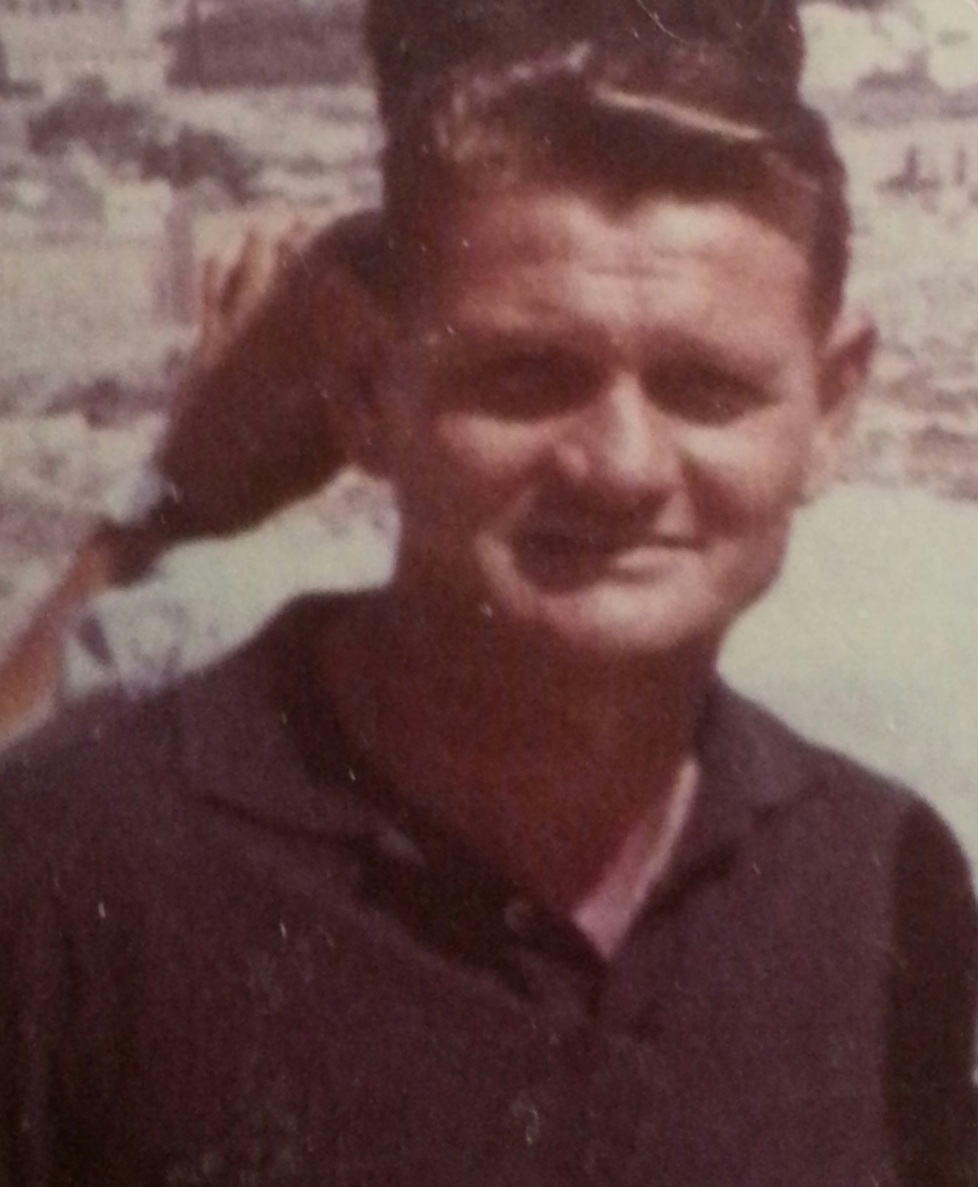

Personal information
- Date of birth: 2 December 1921
- Place of birth: Bucharest, Romania
- Date of death: 24 May 1979 (aged 57)
- Place of death: Israel

Senior career*
Years	Team	Apps	(Gls)
1939–1944	Maccabi București		
1946–1952	Hapoel Tel Aviv		
1952–1953	Hapoel Ramat Gan		
1953–1954	Hapoel Kfar Saba		

International career
1949–1950	Israel	5	(0)

Managerial career
- 1954–1955: Hapoel Kfar Saba
- 1958–1960: Hapoel Tel Aviv
- 1959–1963: Israel (assistant manager)
- 1964–1966: Hapoel Petah Tikva
- 1966–1967: Hakoah Ramat Gan
- 1968–1969: Hapoel Jerusalem
- 1969–1970: Maccabi Haifa
- 1971–1973: Israel
- * Club domestic league appearances and goals

Edmond Schmilovich (Romanian: Eduard Smilovici; Hebrew: אדמונד שמילוביץ; 2 December 1921 – 24 May 1979) was a Romanian-Israeli footballer and manager.
