= 1959–60 Liga Alef =

Liga Alef
- Season: 1959-60
- Champions: Shimshon Tel Aviv
- Promoted: Shimshon Tel Aviv
- Relegated: Maccabi Rehovot, Hapoel Netanya
- Matches played: 182
- Goals scored: 477 (2.62 per match)

The 1959–60 Liga Alef season saw Shimshon Tel Aviv win the title and promotion to Liga Leumit.

== Final table ==
Pos	Team	Pld	W	D	L	GF	GA	GD	Pts	Promotion or relegation
1	Shimshon Tel Aviv	26	13	7	6	41	26	+15	33	Promoted to Liga Leumit
2	Hapoel Tiberias	26	15	2	9	49	31	+18	32	
3	Hakoah Tel Aviv	26	14	4	8	40	25	+15	32	
4	Beitar Jerusalem	26	13	6	7	36	28	+8	32	
5	Hapoel Mahane Yehuda	26	11	4	11	41	34	+7	26	
6	Hapoel Kfar Saba	26	10	6	10	40	39	+1	26	
7	Hapoel Rehovot	26	10	6	10	32	38	−6	26	
8	Hapoel Kiryat Haim	26	10	6	10	24	35	−11	26	
9	Hapoel Be'er Sheva	26	10	5	11	32	37	−5	25	
10	Hapoel Ramla	26	10	4	12	36	47	−11	24	
11	Hapoel Hadera	26	8	7	11	33	32	+1	23	
12	Maccabi Hadera	26	7	9	10	28	34	−6	23	
13	Maccabi Rehovot	26	6	7	13	21	30	−9	19	Relegated to Liga Bet
14	Hapoel Netanya	26	5	7	14	24	49	−25	17	Relegated to Liga Bet
