= Jacob Hosias =

Israeli footballer

Jacob Hosias יעקב הוזיאס
Personal information
- Full name: Jacob Hosias
- Date of birth: February 21, 1934
- Place of birth: Latvia
- Date of death: January 31, 2025 (aged 90)
- Place of death: Netanya, Israel

Youth career
- Maccabi Netanya

Senior career*
Years	Team	Apps	(Gls)
1950–1962	Maccabi Netanya	150	(34)
- * Club domestic league appearances and goals

Jacob Hosias (Hebrew: יעקב הוזיאס) was an Israeli footballer who played in Maccabi Netanya from 1950 to 1962.

== Honours ==
- Netanya Cup
  - Winner (1): 1953
- State Cup
  - Runner-up (1): 1953-54
