= Mordechai Shrager =

Israeli footballer

Mordechai Shrager מרדכי שרגר
Personal information
- Full name: Mordechai Shrager
- Place of birth: Israel
- Height: 6 ft 2 in (1.88 m)
- Position: Striker

Senior career*
Years	Team	Apps	(Gls)
194x–1956	Maccabi Rehovot		
1956–1962	Maccabi Netanya	72	(25)
- * Club domestic league appearances and goals

Mordechai Shrager (Hebrew: מרדכי שרגר) is a former Israeli footballer who played in Maccabi Rehovot and Maccabi Netanya.
