= Hananel Meller =

Israeli footballer

Hananel Meller חננאל מלר
Personal information
- Full name: Hananel Meller

Senior career*
Years	Team	Apps	(Gls)
1950–1957	Maccabi Netanya	100	(20)
- * Club domestic league appearances and goals

Hananel Meller (Hebrew: חננאל מלר) is a former Israeli footballer who played with Maccabi Netanya.
