= Reuven Tal =

Israeli sportsperson

Reuven Tal ראובן טל
Personal information
- Full name: Reuven Tal
- Date of birth: 30 July 1932
- Place of birth: Berlin, Germany
- Date of death: June 6, 1967 (aged 34)
- Position: Forward

Senior career*
Years	Team	Apps	(Gls)
1951–1958	Hapoel Balfouria		
- * Club domestic league appearances and goals

Reuven Tal (Hebrew: ראובן טל) was an Israeli footballer and sportsperson. He is best known for his years at Hapoel Balfouria where he was the top scorer for the clubs during the club's two seasons in the top division.

== Biography ==
Tal was born in Berlin as Rainer Grünthal to composer Josef Tal and his wife Rosie. At the age of three the family immigrated to Palestine and settled in 1936 in Jerusalem. His parents divorced and Tal lived with his mother in Jerusalem, and later, between 1944 and 1948, in the UK, where his mother studied Physical therapy.

Upon returning to Palestine, Tal joined Hapoel Jerusalem while also competing with the club's athletics team, winning the 1500 meters run in the 1949 national youth athletics championship. In 1950 Tal was conscripted to the army and joined the Nahal Brigade. While at the army, Tal played and coached at Hapoel Afula, and in 1951, after joining kibbutz Megiddo, and while working in the fields of the kibbutz, Tal maintained his involvement in sports, playing with the local volleyball club and playing football with Hapoel Balfouria. Tal played with the team as it was promoted the Liga Alef, the top division at the time and was the top scorer for the club during its stint in the top division. Tal also studied Physical education at the Wingate Institute and worked as a sports teach at the regional school.

Tal was killed during the Six-Day War, as an Iraqi Tu-16 plane crashed into the base where Tal was stationed, near Afula.

== Honours ==
- Liga Bet (second division) (1):
  - 1951–52 (with Hapoel Balfouria)
