= Yitzhak Casspi =

Israeli footballer (1922–2007)

Yitzhak Casspi יצחק כספי
Personal information
- Full name: Yitzhak Casspi
- Date of birth: September 14, 1922
- Place of birth: Netanya, Israel
- Date of death: 6 June 2017 (aged 94)
- Place of death: Netanya, Israel
- Position: Striker

Youth career
- 1934–1939: Maccabi Netanya

Senior career*
Years	Team	Apps	(Gls)
1939–1957	Maccabi Netanya		
- Hapoel Netanya
- Hapoel Beit Yitzhak

Managerial career
- 1956–1957: Maccabi Netanya
- 1962–1963: Maccabi Netanya
- * Club domestic league appearances and goals

Yitzhak Casspi (Hebrew: יצחק כספי; 1922-2017) was an Israeli footballer who played in Maccabi Netanya.

Casspi's brother Ze'ev also played professional football as a goalkeeper. Both played together in Netanya.

== Honours ==
- Israel State Cup:
  - Runner-up (1): 1954
