= 1957–58 Liga Alef =

Israeli football season

The 1957–58 Liga Alef season saw Beitar Jerusalem win the title. However, there was no promotion to Liga Leumit or relegation to Liga Bet, after the Israel Football Association decided to abandon the league before the end of the season, due to suspicions of bribery.

== Final table ==
Pos	Team	Pld	W	D	L	GF	GA	GD	Pts
1	Beitar Jerusalem	20	13	4	3	33	16	+17	30
2	Bnei Yehuda	20	12	3	5	39	26	+13	27
3	Hapoel Mahane Yehuda	20	11	4	5	63	41	+22	26
4	Shimshon Tel Aviv	20	8	7	5	27	16	+11	23
5	Hapoel Kiryat Haim	20	8	5	7	36	36	0	21
6	Maccabi Hadera	20	7	7	6	21	33	−12	21
7	Maccabi Rehovot	20	6	6	8	33	29	+4	18
8	Hapoel Hadera	20	6	6	8	26	30	−4	18
9	Hakoah Tel Aviv	20	6	6	8	32	43	−11	18
10	Hapoel Afula	20	6	3	11	31	40	−9	15 (Note: Hapoel Balfouria which were promoted from Liga Bet, merged with Hapoel Afula in 1954. however, since the 1957-58 season, they were officially known as Hapoel Afula, and also mentioned by the press in both names.)
11	Hapoel Rehovot	19	4	5	10	26	42	−16	13
12	Maccabi Sha'arayim	18	3	2	13	16	41	−25	8
