= 1957–58 Liga Leumit =

Football league season

Liga Leumit
- Season: 1957–58
- Champions: Maccabi Tel Aviv; 9th title
- Top goalscorer: Rafi Levi (14)

The 1957–58 Liga Leumit season lasted from December 1957 until May 1958. Maccabi Tel Aviv won the title, whilst the club's Rafi Levi was the league's top scorer with 14 goals.

There was no relegation from the league and no clubs were promoted from Liga Alef at the end of the season.

== Final table ==
Pos	Team	Pld	W	D	L	GF	GA	GD	Pts
1	Maccabi Tel Aviv	22	13	9	0	50	12	+38	35
2	Hapoel Petah Tikva	22	15	4	3	50	21	+29	34
3	Maccabi Haifa	22	12	3	7	42	24	+18	27
4	Maccabi Netanya	22	5	11	6	21	23	−2	21
5	Hapoel Tel Aviv	22	6	8	8	29	40	−11	20
6	Hapoel Ramat Gan	22	6	8	8	21	33	−12	20
7	Hapoel Haifa	22	7	5	10	33	32	+1	19
8	Maccabi Jaffa	22	8	3	11	24	34	−10	19
9	Beitar Tel Aviv	22	8	3	11	30	51	−21	19
10	Hapoel Jerusalem	22	6	6	10	20	28	−8	18
11	Maccabi Petah Tikva	22	7	3	12	30	37	−7	17
12	Hapoel Kfar Saba	22	6	3	13	30	45	−15	15

Source: rsssf.com

== Results ==
Home \ Away	BTA	HHA	HJE	HKS	HPT	HRG	HTA	MHA	MJA	MNE	MPT	MTA
Beitar Tel Aviv		3–1	1–2	1–0	0–3	2–2	1–2	3–2	3–0	2–2	1–2	0–6
Hapoel Haifa	4–1		0–2	2–0	3–2	6–0	5–2	1–2	0–2	1–1	1–0	2–2
Hapoel Jerusalem	0–1	0–1		3–0	2–2	0–1	1–2	2–3	1–0	0–0	2–0	0–1
Hapoel Kfar Saba	1–2	3–1	4–0		2–3	3–2	1–2	0–5	1–0	1–4	2–2	3–3
Hapoel Petah Tikva	3–1	2–1	5–0	2–1		3–0	4–2	3–1	2–0	2–0	3–2	0–0
Hapoel Ramat Gan	2–2	1–1	0–2	1–1	2–0		1–0	1–0	2–0	0–0	1–3	0–3
Hapoel Tel Aviv	4–1	1–1	1–1	0–2	2–2	1–1		2–2	4–3	0–1	0–2	0–0
Maccabi Haifa	4–0	1–0	0–0	2–0	0–4	2–0	4–0		3–0	3–0	1–2	1–1
Maccabi Jaffa	1–0	2–0	1–1	4–2	2–1	0–0	1–2	2–1		1–1	2–0	1–3
Maccabi Netanya	1–2	0–0	1–1	1–0	0–1	1–1	2–2	0–2	3–0		2–1	0–0
Maccabi Petah Tikva	1–2	3–2	3–0	1–2	0–3	1–2	4–0	1–3	1–2	0–0		1–1
Maccabi Tel Aviv	8–1	2–0	1–0	4–1	0–0	2–1	0–0	2–0	3–0	3–1	5–0	

Legend: Blue = home team win; Yellow = draw; Red = away team win.
