= Sar-Tov Stadium =

Former stadium in Netanya, Israel

Coordinates: 32°20′02.18″N 34°51′43.91″E

Sar-Tov Stadium איצטדיון שר-טוב
- The Box הקופסא
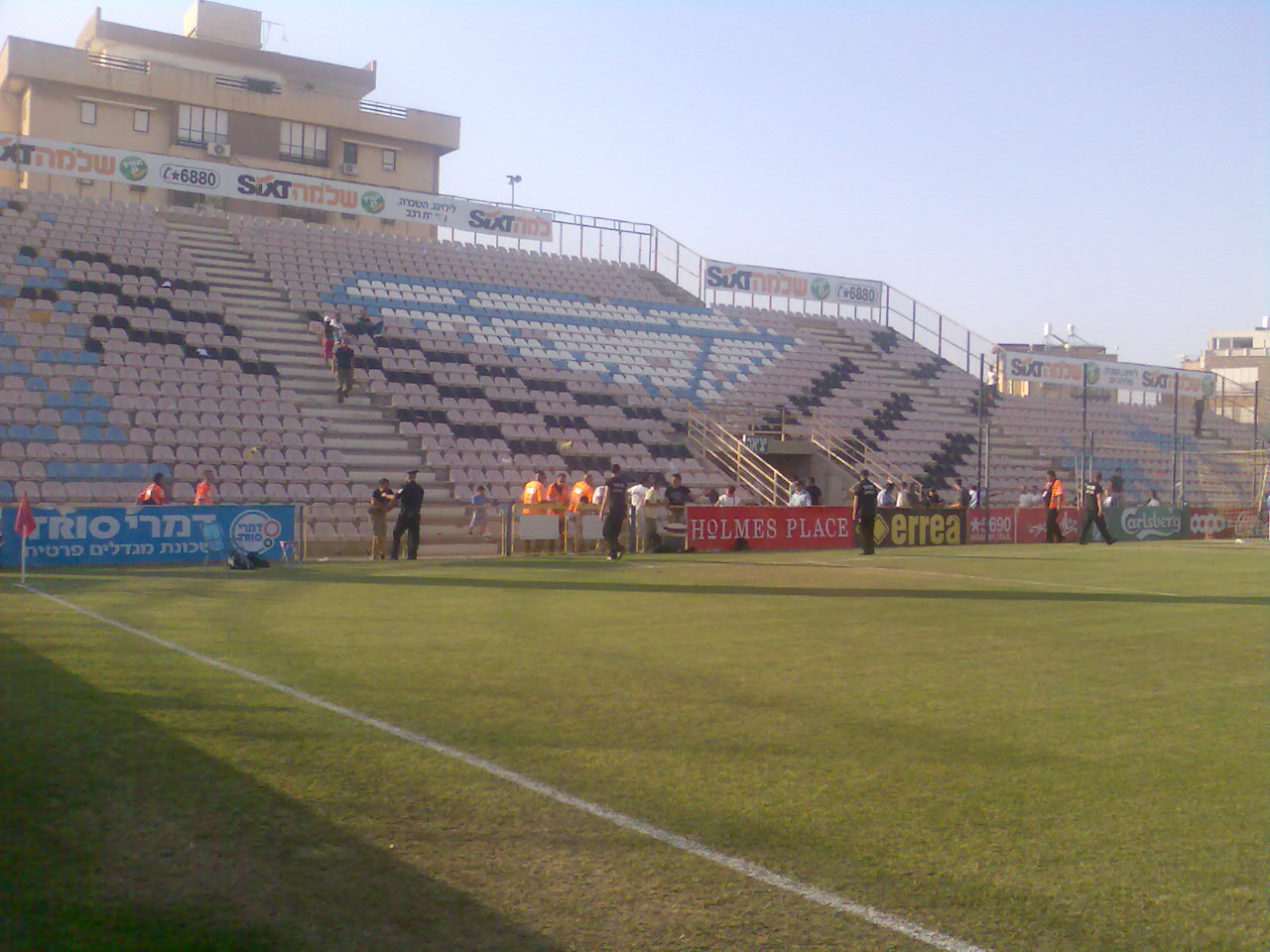
- Interactive map of Sar-Tov Stadium איצטדיון שר-טוב
- Location: Netanya, Israel
- Owner: City of Netanya
- Operator: City of Netanya
- Capacity: 7,500
- Surface: Grass

Construction
- Opened: 1945
- Closed: 2014

Tenant
- Maccabi Netanya (1943-2012)

Sar-Tov Stadium (Hebrew: איצטדיון שר-טוב, Itztadion Sar-Tov), commonly known as HaKufsa (הקופסה, lit. The Box) was a football stadium in Netanya, Israel. It was used mostly for football matches and was the home stadium of Maccabi Netanya. In 2012, Maccabi Netanya moved to the newly built Netanya Stadium

== Names ==
The official name was the "Sar-Tov Stadium", named in honor of Joseph Sar-Tov, who was one of the founders of Maccabi Netanya and served as the first chairman of the club. Over the years, the stadium was dubbed "HaKufsa" ("The Box"); the nickname comes from the relatively small size of the ground and being surrounded by stands in a manner reminiscent of a box.

== History ==
The Sar-Tov Stadium, was officially inaugurated in August 1943.

The first game played in the stadium was an official match against local Maccabi Netanya as part of the European Club Cup on January 1, 1945. The name of the opponent is subject of debate, some sources saying the Yugoslav, Greek, or British army team, the latter option being the prevalent opinion. Before the game, the stadium was officially inaugurated in the presence of city officials including its mayor Oved Ben-Ami.

Former player Yitzhak Caspi mentioned that, at that time, the stadium was nothing but a plot of land. Later it was simply surrounded by ropes and then a small fence was built. The safety conditions at the stadium led to the formation of a "Stewards' Unit," composed of fans who voluntarily took on the entire responsibility for security and order at the venue, without any compensation. Their main role was to prevent children and passersbies from sneaking into the stadium. In 1984, the police ordered the unit to be disbanded, and responsibility for security and order was transferred to private security companies.

In 2014, Sar-Tov Stadium was demolished. The land where it sat was sold and funds went to finance the construction of the Netanya Stadium. The Sar-Tov Stadium demolition site has since been replaced by residential buildings.
