= Maccabi Rehovot F.C. =

Israeli football club

Maccabi Rehovot
- Full name: Maccabi Rehovot Football Club
- Founded: 1912
- Ground: Kiryat Moshe, Rehovot
- Chairman: Meir Nahmani
- 2014–15: Liga Gimel Central, 9th
Home colours	Away colours

Maccabi Rehovot F.C. (Hebrew: מכבי רחובות) is an Israeli football club based in Rehovot. The club was a founding member of the Israeli League in 1949 and competed in the top division during the 1950s, but today plays in Liga Gimel, the fifth and lowest level of Israeli football.

== History ==
Founded in 1912, Maccabi Rehovot is one of the oldest clubs in Israeli football. Prior to the Israeli Declaration of Independence, the club played at the Palestine League and were runners-up in the 1943–44 season, behind champions, Hapoel Tel Aviv.

Maccabi Rehovot took part in the first post-independence league in 1949–50, finishing 8th out of 13. After several mid-table finishes, the club was relegated to Liga Alef at the end of the 1955–56 season after finishing second from bottom. The following season the club finished second in Liga Alef, which would have resulted in automatic promotion to the top division. However, after it was discovered that 9 out of the 12 clubs of Liga Alef were involved in match-fixing, the Israel Football Association decided to hold a promotion/relegation play-offs. Maccabi finished bottom of the group and remained in the second tier.

In the 1959–60 season, the club was relegated to Liga Bet, the third tier at the time. Ever since, the club plays in the lower divisions of Israeli football. In the 1990s they dropped into Liga Gimel, where they play today.
