= 1955–56 in Israeli football =

Football in Israel
- Season: 1955–56

Men's football
- Liga Leumit: Maccabi Tel Aviv
- Liga Alef: Hakoah Tel Aviv
- Liga Bet: Maccabi Hadera; Maccabi Sha'arayim
- State Cup: Maccabi Tel Aviv

The 1955–56 season was the eighth season of competitive football in Israel and the 30th season under the Israeli Football Association, established in 1928, during the British Mandate.

== Review and Events ==
- The league started with the completion of competitions started during the previous season including all league competitions and the state cup.
- At the end of the league season, the Israeli football league system was reorganized. At the top, a new league was formed, Liga Leumit, pushing the rest of the league down a tier. Liga Leumit was set to have 12 teams, down from 14 teams. At the end of the season, the bottom two teams were set to relegate to second-tier Liga Alef and the 11th and 12th placed team played a promotion/relegation play-offs with the two Liga Alef winners. In the second tier, the division was set to have 12 teams in one national division. Beneath that, Liga Bet was designated as third tier, with two regional divisions of 12 teams in each division. Liga Gimel was designated as fourth tier, divided to regional divisions.
  The new league structure entered a new season beginning in December 1956. The league season was completed by June 1956. At the end of the season, the top division was reduced to 10 clubs, with two clubs relegating to Liga Alef and the 10th placed team playing a promotion/relegation play-off against the top club in 1955–56 Liga Alef.
- On 14 September 1955, with a match between a Haifa XI and Tel Aviv XI, Kiryat Eliezer Stadium was officially opened.
- The national team participated in the 1956 Olympics qualification, playing against the USSR.

== Domestic leagues ==
=== 1954–55 Liga Alef ===
The league, which started during the previous season, was completed on 16 October 1955 and was won by Hapoel Petah Tikva, its first ever championship. At the bottom, Hapoel Hadera and Hapoel Balfouria relegated to 1955–56 Liga Alef. Beitar Jerusalem and Hapoel Kfar Saba finished 11th and 12th and faced 1954–55 Liga Bet regional divisions' winners, Hapoel Kiryat Haim and Maccabi Jaffa, at the end of which, Hapoel Kfar Saba retained its place in the top division, joined by Maccabi Jaffa.

==== Final table ====
Pos	Team	Pld	W	D	L	GF	GA	GR	Pts	
1	Hapoel Petah Tikva	26	18	4	4	68	23	2.957	40	Champions
2	Maccabi Tel Aviv	26	17	4	5	84	28	3.000	38	
3	Hapoel Tel Aviv	26	12	9	5	49	23	2.130	33	
4	Maccabi Netanya	26	13	7	6	54	43	1.256	33	
5	Beitar Tel Aviv	26	12	5	9	64	47	1.362	29	
6	Maccabi Haifa	26	11	6	9	54	41	1.317	28	
7	Maccabi Petah Tikva	26	10	7	9	37	41	0.902	27	
8	Maccabi Rehovot	26	11	4	11	49	48	1.021	26	
9	Hapoel Haifa	26	9	6	11	40	55	0.727	24	
10	Hapoel Ramat Gan	26	10	3	13	35	41	0.854	23	
11	Beitar Jerusalem	26	8	5	13	37	59	0.627	21	Relegation Playoffs
12	Hapoel Kfar Saba	26	6	6	14	38	46	0.826	18	Relegation Playoffs
13	Hapoel Hadera	26	7	2	17	36	53	0.679	16	Relegated to Liga Bet
14	Hapoel Balfouria	26	3	2	21	32	129	0.248	8	Relegated to Liga Bet

Source: 100 Years of Football 1906-2006, Elisha Shohat (Israel), 2006

==== Promotion/relegation play-offs ====
Pos	Team	Pld	W	D	L	GF	GA	GR	Pts	
1	Maccabi Jaffa	3	2	1	0	8	2	4.000	5	Placed in Liga Leumit
2	Hapoel Kfar Saba	3	1	2	0	5	3	1.667	4	Placed in Liga Leumit
3	Hapoel Kiryat Haim	3	1	1	1	5	7	0.714	3	Placed in Liga Alef
4	Beitar Jerusalem	3	0	0	3	3	9	0.333	0	Placed in Liga Alef

Updated to match(es) played on 15 October 1955. Source: 100 Years of Football 1906-2006, Elisha Shohat (Israel), 2006

=== 1955–56 Liga Leumit ===
The league started on 3 December 1955 and was played until 2 June 1956. Maccabi Tel Aviv won the title, while Maccabi Rehovot and Hapoel Kfar Saba finished bottom and relegated to 1956–57 Liga Alef. Maccabi Jaffa, who finished 10th, played a promotion/relegation play-offs against Hakoah Tel Aviv, and won both matches to stay in the top division.

==== Final table ====
Pos	Team	Pld	W	D	L	GF	GA	GR	Pts	Qualification or relegation
1	Maccabi Tel Aviv	22	13	6	3	47	16	2.938	32	Champions
2	Hapoel Petah Tikva	22	12	5	5	54	28	1.929	29	
3	Hapoel Tel Aviv	22	12	5	5	49	29	1.690	29	
4	Maccabi Petah Tikva	22	10	7	5	43	34	1.265	27	
5	Maccabi Haifa	22	11	3	8	53	27	1.963	25	
6	Hapoel Haifa	22	9	4	9	32	39	0.821	22	
7	Beitar Tel Aviv	22	10	0	12	41	48	0.854	20	
8	Maccabi Netanya	22	9	2	11	31	44	0.705	20	
9	Hapoel Ramat Gan	22	9	0	13	28	42	0.667	18	
10	Maccabi Jaffa	22	6	5	11	39	44	0.886	17	Relegation Playoffs
11	Maccabi Rehovot	22	6	1	15	25	62	0.403	13	Relegated to Liga Alef
12	Hapoel Kfar Saba	22	3	6	13	20	48	0.417	12	Relegated to Liga Alef

Source: Davar (in Hebrew)
Rules for classification: 1) points; 2) goal ratio 3) goals scored.

==== Promotion/relegation playoffs ====
The 10th-placed Maccabi Jaffa faced 1955–56 Liga Alef winner, Hakoah Tel Aviv. The matches took place on June 10 and 17, 1956.

9 June 1956	Maccabi Jaffa	3–1	Hakoah Tel Aviv	Tel Aviv
	B. Cohen 32', 53'; Kalev 72'	Davar	74' Ashkenazi	Stadium: Maccabi Jaffa Ground; Attendance: 5000; Referee: Reuven Frizner

16 June 1956	Hakoah Tel Aviv	0–1	Maccabi Jaffa	Tel Aviv
		Davar	18' Ghougasian	Stadium: Hatikva Neighborhood Stadium; Attendance: 4000; Referee: Aharon Werner

Maccabi Jaffa won 4–1 on aggregate and remained in Liga Leumit. Hakoah Tel Aviv remained in Liga Alef.

== Domestic cups ==
=== 1954–55 Israel State Cup ===
The competition, which started on 22 January 1955, was played until autumn 1956, with the final being played on 19 November 1956. Maccabi Tel Aviv had beaten Hapoel Petah Tikva 3–1 in the final.

==== Final ====
19 November 1955

Maccabi Tel Aviv	3–1	Hapoel Petah tikva
Nahmias 8'; Glazer 35'; Studinski 68'		Kofman 84'

Basa Stadium, Tel Aviv
Attendance: 12,000
Referee: Reuven Frizner

=== 1956–57 Israel State Cup ===
The competition started on 11 February 1956 and was completed during the next season.

=== Netanya 25th Anniversary Cup ===
In October and November, while the promotion playoffs and the State Cup were being played, two cup competitions were organized by Liga Leumit Clubs, the second edition of the Shapira Cup, and the Netanya 25th Anniversary Cup. The Shapira Cup, in which Hapoel Tel Aviv, Maccabi Tel Aviv, Maccabi Haifa and Hapoel Petah Tikva participated, was abandoned after two rounds of play.

Maccabi Netanya, Beitar Tel Aviv, Maccabi Petah Tikva and Hapoel Ramat Gan took part in a second cup competition, dedicated to the 25th anniversary of Netanya.

==== Table ====
Pos	Team	Pld	W	D	L	GF	GA	GR	Pts	Qualification
1	Maccabi Petah Tikva	3	2	1	0	14	5	2.800	5	Winners
2	Hapoel Ramat Gan	3	1	1	1	8	7	1.143	3	
3	Maccabi Netanya	3	1	1	1	5	7	0.714	3	
4	Beitar Tel Aviv	3	0	1	2	7	15	0.467	1	

Source: Hadshot HaSport, p. 1

== National Teams ==
=== National team ===
After more than a year of inactivity, the national team was reorganized under a new coach, Jack Gibbons. The national team played several matches against local teams and visiting teams, travelled to the U.S. to play an American Soccer League XI in an Israeli Independence Day celebration and competed against the Soviet Union in the 1956 Olympics qualification. The national team was also due to participate in the 1956 AFC Asian Cup qualification and was drawn to play Pakistan in the first round and Afghanistan in the second round. However, both teams declined playing Israel. As all the other teams in the western zone withdrew, the national team qualified as regional winner.

==== 1956 Olympics qualification ====
Team	Pld	W	D	L	GF	GA	GD	Pts
Soviet Union	2	2	0	0	7	1	+6	4
Israel	2	0	0	2	1	7	−6	0

==== 1955–56 matches ====
29 April 1956 Friendly	American Soccer League XI	1–2	Israel	New York
	Garbovsky 27'	Davar (in Hebrew)	6' Kofman; 26' Stelmach	Stadium: Yankee Stadium; Attendance: 75,000

11 July 1956 Ol. Q.	Soviet Union	5–0	Israel	Moscow
	Tatushin 2'; Ivanov 26', 71'; Simonyan 45', 79'	Report (in Hebrew)		Stadium: Dynamo Stadium; Attendance: 70,000; Referee: (Wales) Griffiths

31 July 1956 Ol. Q.	Israel	1–2	Soviet Union	Ramat Gan
	Stelmach 66'	Report	Ilyin 57'; Tatushin 79'	Stadium: Ramat Gan Stadium; Attendance: 60,000; Referee: (Italy) Liverani

== International club matches ==
=== Visiting foreign teams ===
==== FK Sarajevo ====
30 January 1956	Hapoel Tel Aviv	0–3	FK Sarajevo	Tel Aviv
		Davar (in Hebrew)	31' Radičević; 44', 88' Jusufbegović	Stadium: Basa Stadium, Tel Aviv; Attendance: 5,000; Referee: Ben Rubi

2 February 1956	Maccabi Netanya	0–2	FK Sarajevo	Netanya
		Davar (in Hebrew)	13' Pašić; 69' Jusufbegović	Stadium: Sar-Tov Stadium; Attendance: 4,000; Referee: Frizner

4 February 1956	Israel	3–3	FK Sarajevo	Tel Aviv
	Zelikovich 7'; Stelmach 19'; Ben Dror 69' (pen.)	Davar (in Hebrew)	30' Radičević; 35' Novo; 79' Jusufbegović	Stadium: Basa Stadium, Tel Aviv; Attendance: 12,000; Referee: Sher

8 February 1956	Maccabi Tel Aviv	0–2	FK Sarajevo	Tel Aviv
		Davar (in Hebrew)	25' Pašić; 32' Biogradlić	Stadium: Basa Stadium, Tel Aviv; Attendance: 5,000; Referee: Werner

==== Kapfenberger SV ====
In February 1956 the Israeli government lifted the ban on hosting teams from Austria and Hapoel and Maccabi Petah Tikva invited Kapfenberger SV to a tour of Israel. The visit was met with criticism from right-wing politicians and acts of sabotage in order to stop the Austrian team from playing, but the matches went ahead as planned.

12 February 1956	Hapoel Petah Tikva	2–2	Kapfenberger SV	Petah Tikva
	Kofman 17'; Flascher 45' (o.g.)	Davar (in Hebrew)	41' Bihas; 59' Gollnhuber	Stadium: Hapoel Ground; Attendance: 3,500

15 February 1956	Israel	2–1	Kapfenberger SV	Tel Aviv
	Israeli 6'; Zelikovich 53'	Davar (in Hebrew)	69' (pen.) Kolar	Stadium: Basa Stadium, Tel Aviv; Attendance: 7,000; Referee: Ben Rubi

16 February 1956	Maccabi Haifa	2–3	Kapfenberger SV	Haifa
	Ben-Tzvi 8'; Litvak 72'	Davar (in Hebrew)	60' Wirboda; 65' Hauberger; 87' Gollnhuber	Stadium: Kiryat Eliezer Stadium; Attendance: 6,500; Referee: Klein

19 February 1956	Maccabi Petah Tikva	1–2	Kapfenberger SV	Petah Tikva
	Nadel 41'	Davar (in Hebrew)	65', 80' Sillaber	Stadium: Hapoel Ground; Attendance: 3,000; Referee: Rosenbaum

21 February 1956	Petah Tikva XI	0–1	Kapfenberger SV	Tel Aviv
		Davar (in Hebrew)	5' Hofka	Stadium: Basa Stadium, Tel Aviv; Attendance: 3,000

==== Sunderland ====
3 May 1956	Maccabi Petah Tikva	2–3	Sunderland	Ramat Gan
	Scharf 20'; Turkenitz 68' (pen.)		7', 36', 69' Fleming	Stadium: Ramat Gan Stadium; Attendance: 10,000; Referee: Frizner

5 May 1956	Maccabi Haifa	3–4	Sunderland	Haifa
	Held 23', 58'; Almani 41'		16' Elliott; 76' Fleming; 81' Morrison 87' Shackleton	Stadium: Kiryat Eliezer Stadium; Attendance: 10,000; Referee: Sher

7 May 1956	Israel	1–1	Sunderland	Ramat Gan
	Held 60'		20' Holden	Stadium: Ramat Gan Stadium; Attendance: 25,000; Referee: Ben Rubi

13 May 1956	Hapoel Haifa	2–4	Sunderland	Haifa
	Avraham Ginzburg	HaTzofe	Fleming; Shackleton; Holden	Stadium: Kiryat Eliezer Stadium; Attendance: 6,000

==== Rampla Juniors ====
10 May 1956	Israel	0–2	Rampla Juniors	Ramat Gan
			56' Pérez; 59' R. Rodríguez	Stadium: Ramat Gan Stadium; Attendance: 20,000; Referee: Moshe Cohen

12 May 1955	Hapoel XI	1–2	Rampla Juniors	Tel Aviv
	H. Glazer 75'	Davar (in Hebrew)	19' Pérez; 24' Omarini	Stadium: Basa Stadium, Tel Aviv; Attendance: 12,000; Referee: Werner

==== São Cristóvão ====
6 June 1956	Hapoel Petah Tikva	3–0	São Cristóvão	Petah Tikva
	Kofman 18'; Stelmach 51'; Ratzabi 75'	Davar (in Hebrew)		Stadium: Hapoel Ground; Attendance: 5,000; Referee: Dudkevich

9 June 1956	Hapoel Tel Aviv	0–1	São Cristóvão	Tel Aviv
		Ma'ariv (in Hebrew)	2' Santo Cristo	Stadium: Basa Stadium, Tel Aviv; Attendance: 4,000; Referee: Fried

13 June 1956	Israel	0–0	São Cristóvão	Tel Aviv
		Davar (in Hebrew)		Stadium: Basa Stadium, Tel Aviv; Attendance: 6,000; Referee: Rosenbaum

16 June 1956	Hapoel XI	0–0	São Cristóvão	Tel Aviv
		Davar (in Hebrew)		Stadium: Basa Stadium, Tel Aviv; Referee: Ben Rubi

18 June 1956	Hapoel Jerusalem	0–2	São Cristóvão	Jerusalem
		Davar (in Hebrew)	34' Décio; 73' Valdir	Stadium: YMCA Stadium; Referee: Hillman

==== First Vienna ====
20 June 1956	Israel	1–1	First Vienna	Ramat Gan
	Kofman 59'	Davar (in Hebrew)	69' Walzhofer	Stadium: Ramat Gan Stadium; Attendance: 25,000; Referee: Frizner

23 June 1956	Maccabi Tel Aviv	0–2	First Vienna	Tel Aviv
			27' Jericha; 47' Pichler	Stadium: Basa Stadium, Tel Aviv; Attendance: 8,000; Referee: Ben Rubi

25 June 1956	Maccabi Netanya	1–5	First Vienna	Netanya
	Hosias 8'		22' Manasse; 32' Pichler; 40' Buzek; 79', 85' (pen.) Walzhofer	Stadium: Sar-Tov Stadium; Attendance: 4,000

28 June 1956	Hapoel Jerusalem	0–3	First Vienna	Jerusalem
			17', 86' Buzek; 26' Manasse	Stadium: YMCA Stadium; Attendance: 6,000; Referee: Palman

30 June 1956	Maccabi Haifa	1–4	First Vienna	Tel Aviv
	Almani 71'		51', 73', 47' Buzek; 67' Manasse	Stadium: Basa Stadium, Tel Aviv; Attendance: 6,000; Referee: Palman
