= 1955–56 Hapoel Hadera F.C. season =

Hapoel Hadera
1955–56 season
- Stadium: Hapoel Ground, Hadera
- Liga Alef (1955) Liga Alef (1956): 13th 7th
- State Cup State Cup: QF not completed

The 1955–56 Hapoel Hadera season was the club's 23rd season since its establishment, in 1934, and 8th since the establishment of the State of Israel.

At the start of the season, the league which started during the previous season was completed, with the club finishing 13th (out of 14), which meant the club relegated to the second division, which was renamed Liga Alef, and played in this division during the remainder of the season, finishing 7th (out of 12), remaining in the second division ahead of the next season.

During the season, the club also completed in the State Cup competition, which started during the previous season. The club was knocked out in the quarter-finals by Maccabi Tel Aviv, the eventual winners of the competition.

== Match Results ==
=== Legend ===
Win Draw Loss

=== 1954–55 Liga Alef ===
The league began on 6 February 1955, and by the time the previous season ended, only 20 rounds of matches were completed, with the final 6 rounds being played during September and October 1955.

==== Final table ====
Pos	Club	P	W	D	L	GF	GA	GR	Pts	
9	Hapoel Haifa	26	9	6	11	40	55	0.73	24	
10	Hapoel Ramat Gan	26	10	3	13	35	41	0.85	23	
11	Beitar Jerusalem	26	8	5	13	37	59	0.63	21	Promotion/relegation play-offs
12	Hapoel Kfar Saba	26	6	6	14	38	46	0.83	18	Promotion/relegation play-offs
13	Hapoel Hadera	26	7	2	17	36	53	0.68	16	Relegated to Liga Alef
14	Hapoel Balfouria	26	3	2	21	32	129	0.25	8	Relegated to Liga Alef

==== Matches ====
3 September 1955 21	Maccabi Haifa	3–2	Hapoel Hadera	Haifa
	Tenenbaum 18', 76'; Georgiou 46'	Report (p. 8)	30' Rubin; 41' (o.g.) Cohen	Stadium: Kiryat Haim Stadium; Attendance: 2,000; Referee: Rosenbaum

10 September 1955 22	Hapoel Petah Tikva	3–1	Hapoel Hadera	Petah Tikva
	Stelmach 28', 40', 60'	Report (p. 8)	12' (pen.) Weinberg	Stadium: Hapoel Ground; Attendance: 2,000; Referee: Scheindling

24 September 1955 23	Beitar Jerusalem	4–2	Hapoel Hadera	Jerusalem
	Elfasi 35'; Zion 63', 76'; Hasson 87'	Report (p. 8)	9' Piterman; 14' Haviv	Stadium: YMCA Stadium; Attendance: 6,000; Referee: Dudkevich

1 October 1955 24	Hapoel Hadera	5–1	Hapoel Balfouria	Hadera
	Weinberg 21' (pen.); Halfon 51'; Afgin 63'; Piterman 65'; Gertner 85'	Report (p. 8)	73' Tal	Stadium: Hapoel Ground; Attendance: 500; Referee: Moshe Cohen

8 October 1955 25	Hapoel Hadera	0–1	Hapoel Haifa	Hadera
		Report (p. 8)	32' M. Simantiris	Stadium: Hapoel Ground; Attendance: 1,000; Referee: Frizner

15 October 1955 26	Maccabi Rehovot	4–2	Hapoel Hadera	Rehovot
	Jamil 4'; Shrager 23'; Herschkovitz 35'; Litvak 46'	Report (p. 8)	6' Gali; 80' Haviv	Stadium: Maccabi Ground; Attendance: 1,500; Referee: Markovich

==== Results by match ====
Round	1	2	3	4	5	6	7	8	9	10	11	12	13	14	15	16	17	18	19	20	21	22	23	24	25	26
Result	L	W	L	W	W	L	L	L	L	W	L	D	W	L	D	W	L	L	L	L	L	L	L	W	L	L
Position	13	8	10	7	6	7	9	11	13	9	11	12	9	11	10	9	11	12	12	13	13	13	13	13	13	13

Updated to match(es) played on 15 October 1955. Source: 2 Dear Points
W = Win; D = Draw; L = Loss

=== 1955–56 Liga Alef ===
==== Final table ====
Pos	Club	P	W	D	L	GF	GA	GR	Pts	
5	Hapoel Nahariya	21	7	8	6	40	36	1.11	22	
6	Hapoel Mahane Yehuda	22	7	6	9	38	33	1.15	20	
7	Hapoel Hadera	22	9	2	11	42	38	1.11	20	
8	Maccabi Ramat Gan	22	7	6	9	31	34	0.91	20	
9	Ahva Notzrit Haifa	22	9	2	11	31	40	0.78	20	Relegation play-offs

An 18th round match between Hapoel Nahariya and Beitar Jerusalem wasn't played due to misunderstanding between the teams regarding the time of the match, and was left unplayed at the end of the season.

==== Matches ====
3 December 1955 1	Hapoel Kiryat Haim	2–0	Hapoel Hadera	Haifa
	Handler 38'; Havinski 40'			Stadium: Kiryat Haim Stadium; Attendance: 1,000; Referee: Zahavi

10 December 1955 2	Hapoel Jerusalem	1–2	Hapoel Hadera	Jerusalem
	Yatzkan 62'		10' Gali; 53' Rubin	Stadium: YMCA Stadium; Attendance: 4,000; Referee: Handel

17 December 1955 3	Hapoel Hadera	2–1	Ahva Notzrit Haifa	Hadera
	Haviv 59', 63'		68' Subhi	Stadium: Hapoel Ground; Attendance: 500; Referee: Schwartz

24 December 1955 4	Hapoel Hadera	2–0	Beitar Jerusalem	Hadera
	Barzilai 68'; Haviv 83'			Stadium: Hapoel Ground; Attendance: 400; Referee: Frizner

31 December 1955 5	Hapoel Rehovot	2–0	Hapoel Hadera	Rehovot

7 January 1956 6	Hapoel Hadera	1–0	Maccabi Ramat Gan	Hadera

14 January 1956 7	Hapoel Hadera	0–2	Hakoah Tel Aviv

21 January 1956 8	Hapoel Hadera	4–2	Hapoel Balfouria	Hadera

4 February 1956 9	Hapoel Hadera	8–0	Hapoel Ra'anana	Hadera

11 February 1956 10	Hapoel Mahane Yehuda	1–1	Hapoel Hadera	Petah Tikva

18 February 1956 11	Hapoel Hadera	1–3	Hapoel Nahariya	Hadera

3 March 1956 12	Hapoel Hadera	1–2	Hapoel Kiryat Haim	Hadera
	Solomon 20'		31' Handler; 87' Erlich	Stadium: Hapoel Ground; Referee: Dudkevich

10 March 1956 13	Hapoel Hadera	4–4	Hapoel Jerusalem	Hadera
	Gillerman 20'; Weinberg 39' (pen.); Barzilai 51'; Halfon 57'		3' Fruchtman; 10', 12' Mizrahi; 40' (o.g.) Gertner	Stadium: Hapoel Ground; Referee: Rosenbaum

17 March 1956 14	Ahva Notzrit Haifa	1–2	Hapoel Hadera
	Najib 25'		10' Fon; 44' Piterman	Referee: Scheindling

24 March 1956 15	Beitar Jerusalem	3–8	Hapoel Hadera	Jerusalem
	Federman 5'; Zion 37'; Elfasi 88' (pen.)		6', 48', 77' Piterman; 20' Agi; 30', 75' Salomon; 52' ? 65' (o.g.) ?	Stadium: YMCA Stadium; Attendance: 4,000; Referee: Wackermann

31 March 1956 16	Hapoel Hadera	2–3	Hapoel Rehovot	Hadera
	Solomon 2'; Fon 90'		14', 73' M. Sharabi; 80' Yefet	Stadium: Hapoel Ground; Referee: Wackermann

7 April 1956 17	Maccabi Ramat Gan	1–0	Hapoel Hadera

14 April 1956 18	Hakoah Tel Aviv	2–0	Hapoel Hadera	Netanya
	Ashkenazi 48'; Heine 70'

22 April 1956 19	Hapoel Balfouria	3–1	Hapoel Hadera	Afula

19 May 1956 20	Hapoel Ra'anana	2–0	Hapoel Hadera

27 May 1956 21	Hapoel Hadera	2–1	Hapoel Mahane Yehuda

2 June 1956 22	Hapoel Nahariya	2–1	Hapoel Hadera	Nahariya

==== Results by match ====
Round	1	2	3	4	5	6	7	8	9	10	11	12	13	14	15	16	17	18	19	20	21	22
Result	L	W	W	W	L	W	L	W	W	D	L	L	D	W	W	L	L	L	L	L	W	L
Position	9	7	4	3	4	4	5	5	3	3	4	5	5	3	3	3	4	4	5	5	5	7

Updated to match(es) played on 28 July 1956. Source: IFA
W = Win; D = Draw; L = Loss

=== State Cup ===
27 August 1955 QF	Maccabi Tel Aviv	6–0	Hapoel Hadera	Tel Aviv
	Studinski 4', 75'; Israeli 16'; Merimovich 20', 68'; Schneor 68'			Stadium: Basa Stadium
