= 1955–56 Beitar Jerusalem F.C. season =

Beitar Jerusalem
1955–56 season
- Manager: Egon Pollak; Wermes
- Stadium: YMCA Stadium
- Liga Alef (1955) Liga Alef (1956): 11th 10th
- State Cup: not completed

The 1955–56 Beitar Jerusalem season was the club's 20th season since its establishment, in 1936, and 8th since the establishment of the State of Israel.

At the start of the season, the league which started during the previous season was completed, with the club finishing 11th (out of 14), which meant the club had to compete in a promotion/relegation play-offs against the 12th placed club, Hapoel Kfar Saba, and the two Liga Bet winners, Maccabi Jaffa and Hapoel Kiryat Haim. The club lost all three play-offs matches and was relegated to the second division, which was renamed Liga Alef, and played in this division during the remainder of the season, finishing 10th (out of 12), which meant that the club had to face another promotion/relegation play-offs, which were delayed and were played at the beginning of the next season.

== Match results ==
=== Legend ===
Win Draw Loss

=== 1954–55 Liga Alef ===
The league began on 6 February 1955, and by the time the previous season ended, only 20 rounds of matches were completed, with the final 6 rounds being played during September and October 1955.

==== Final table ====
Pos	Team	Pld	W	D	L	GF	GA	GR	Pts	
9	Hapoel Haifa	26	9	6	11	40	55	0.727	24	
10	Hapoel Ramat Gan	26	10	3	13	35	41	0.854	23	
11	Beitar Jerusalem	26	8	5	13	37	59	0.627	21	Relegation Playoffs
12	Hapoel Kfar Saba	26	6	6	14	38	46	0.826	18	Relegation Playoffs
13	Hapoel Hadera	26	7	2	17	36	53	0.679	16	Relegated to Liga Bet

Source: 100 Years of Football 1906-2006, Elisha Shohat (Israel), 2006

==== Matches ====
3 September 1955 21	Beitar Jerusalem	2–1	Hapoel Petah Tikva	Jerusalem
	Elfasi 49'; Yehezkel 58'	Report (p. 8)	Kofman 72'	Stadium: YMCA Stadium; Attendance: 7,000; Referee: Werner

10 September 1955 22	Hapoel Kfar Saba	0–1	Beitar Jerusalem	Kfar Saba
		Report (p. 8)	44' Elfasi	Stadium: Hapoel Ground; Attendance: 2,500; Referee: Frizner

24 September 1955 23	Beitar Jerusalem	4–2	Hapoel Hadera	Jerusalem
	Elfasi 35'; Zion 63', 76'; Hasson 87'	Report (p. 8)	9' Piterman; 14' Haviv	Stadium: YMCA Stadium; Attendance: 6,000; Referee: Dudkevich

1 October 1955 24	Beitar Jerusalem	0–1	Hapoel Ramat Gan	Jerusalem
		Report (p. 8)	57' R. Cohen	Stadium: YMCA Stadium; Attendance: 7,000; Referee: Frizner

8 October 1955 25	Hapoel Balfouria	4–2	Beitar Jerusalem	Afula
	Kochavi 34'; Tal 38', 88'; Bentov 61' (pen.)	Report (p. 8)	41' Zion; 86' Elfasi	Stadium: Hapoel Ground; Attendance: 800; Referee: Scheindling

15 October 1955 26	Beitar Jerusalem	1–4	Maccabi Netanya	Jerusalem
	Elfasi 86' (pen.)	Report (p. 8)	4', 69', 80', 87' (pen.) I. Caspi	Stadium: YMCA Stadium; Attendance: 5,000; Referee: Moshe Cohen

==== Results by match ====
Round	1	2	3	4	5	6	7	8	9	10	11	12	13	14	15	16	17	18	19	20	21	22	23	24	25	26
Result	D	L	W	L	D	W	L	L	W	L	L	W	L	W	L	L	D	D	L	D	W	W	W	L	L	L
Position	8	10	7	9	11	8	10	12	8	10	12	9	10	8	11	12	12	13	13	12	12	11	10	10	11	11

Updated to match(es) played on 15 October 1955. Source: 2 Dear Points
W = Win; D = Draw; L = Loss

=== Promotion/relegation play-offs ===
==== Table ====
Pos	Team	Pld	W	D	L	GF	GA	GR	Pts	
1	Maccabi Jaffa	3	2	1	0	8	2	4.000	5	Placed in Liga Leumit
2	Hapoel Kfar Saba	3	1	2	0	5	3	1.667	4	Placed in Liga Leumit
3	Hapoel Kiryat Haim	3	1	1	1	5	7	0.714	3	Placed in Liga Alef
4	Beitar Jerusalem	3	0	0	3	3	9	0.333	0	Placed in Liga Alef

Updated to match(es) played on 15 October 1955. Source: 100 Years of Football 1906-2006, Elisha Shohat (Israel), 2006

Beitar Jerusalem relegated to Liga Alef

==== Matches ====
22 October 1955 1	Hapoel Kfar Saba	3–1	Beitar Jerusalem	Netanya
	Avrutski 5'; Ratz 26'; Glazer 33'	Report (p. 8)	7' Elfasi	Stadium: Sar-Tov Stadium; Attendance: 4,000; Referee: Reuven Frizner

29 October 1955 2	Hapoel Kiryat Haim	3–2	Beitar Jerusalem	Petah Tikva
	Handler 14', 40'; Havinski 25'	Report (p. 8)	6' Zion; 29' Elfasi	Stadium: Hapoel Ground; Attendance: 1,000; Referee: Arie Ben-Rubi

5 November 1955 3	Maccabi Jaffa	3–0	Beitar Jerusalem	Haifa
	B. Cohen 34'; Miranda 41'; Kalev 53'	Report (p. 8)		Stadium: Kiryat Eliezer Stadium; Attendance: 3,000; Referee: Nahman Cohen

=== 1955–56 Liga Alef ===
==== Final table ====
Pos	Team	Pld	W	D	L	GF	GA	GD	Pts	Qualification or relegation
8	Maccabi Ramat Gan	22	7	6	9	31	34	−3	20	
9	Ahva Notzrit Haifa	22	9	2	11	31	40	−9	20	Relegation play-offs
10	Beitar Jerusalem	21	7	3	11	26	45	−19	17 (Note: An 18th round match between Hapoel Nahariya and Beitar Jerusalem wasn't played due to misunderstanding between the teams regarding the time of the match, and was left unplayed at the end of the season.)	Relegation play-offs
11	Hapoel Ra'anana	22	6	4	12	20	49	−29	16	Relegated to Liga Bet
12	Hapoel Balfouria	22	5	3	14	29	44	−15	13	Relegated to Liga Bet

==== Matches ====
3 December 1955 1	Beitar Jerusalem	3–2	Hapoel Rehovot	Jerusalem
	Yehezkel 18'; Zion 53', 70'		44' S. Hadad; 58' I. Hadad	Stadium: YMCA Stadium

10 December 1955 2	Maccabi Ramat Gan	2–2	Beitar Jerusalem	Ramat Gan
	Barbalat 44'; Mishkit 68'		14', 75' Zion	Stadium: Maccabi Ground; Attendance: 1,000; Referee: Schwartz

17 December 1955 3	Beitar Jerusalem	0–2	Hakoah Tel Aviv	Jerusalem
			40', 52' Sa'adia	Stadium: YMCA Stadium; Attendance: 4,000; Referee: Werner

24 December 1955 4	Hapoel Hadera	2–0	Beitar Jerusalem	Hadera
	Barzilai 68'; Haviv 83'			Stadium: Hapoel Ground; Attendance: 400; Referee: Frizner

31 December 1955 5	Beitar Jerusalem	2–0	Hapoel Ra'anana	Jerusalem
				Stadium: YMCA Stadium

7 January 1956 6	Hapoel Mahane Yehuda	4–0	Beitar Jerusalem	Petah Tikva

14 January 1956 7	Hapoel Nahariya	1–1	Beitar Jerusalem	Nahariya

21 January 1956 8	Hapoel Kiryat Haim	7–0	Beitar Jerusalem

4 February 1956 9	Hapoel Jerusalem	0–1	Beitar Jerusalem	Jerusalem
			Elfasi 30'	Stadium: Katamon Stadium; Attendance: 5,000; Referee: Werner

11 February 1956 10	Ahva Notzrit Haifa	3–0	Beitar Jerusalem	Haifa

18 February 1956 11	Beitar Jerusalem	1–1	Hapoel Balfouria	Jerusalem
				Stadium: YMCA Stadium

3 March 1956 12	Hapoel Rehovot	3–2	Beitar Jerusalem	Rehovot
	Mizrahi 49', 60'; Shar'abi		18' Zion; 27' Yehezkel	Stadium: Hapoel Ground; Attendance: 800; Referee: Wackermann

10 March 1956 13	Beitar Jerusalem	2–3	Maccabi Ramat Gan	Jerusalem
	Yehezkel 30', 85'		35', 46' Yakobson; 70' Azami	Stadium: YMCA Stadium; Attendance: 3,000; Referee: Mizrahi

17 March 1956 14	Hakoah Tel Aviv	2–0	Beitar Jerusalem

24 March 1956 15	Beitar Jerusalem	3–8	Hapoel Hadera	Jerusalem
	Federman 5'; Zion 37'; Elfasi 88' (pen.)		6', 48', 77' Piterman; 20' Agi; 30', 75' Salomon; 52' ? 65' (o.g.) ?	Stadium: YMCA Stadium; Attendance: 4,000; Referee: Wackermann

31 March 1956 16	Hapoel Ra'anana	1–0	Beitar Jerusalem

7 April 1956 17	Beitar Jerusalem	3–0	Hapoel Mahane Yehuda	Jerusalem
	Ashkenazi 30'; Hasson 46'; Babayoff 89'			Stadium: YMCA Stadium; Attendance: 4,000; Referee: Handwerg

14 April 1956 18	Hapoel Nahariya	v	Beitar Jerusalem	Nahariya

22 April 1956 19	Beitar Jerusalem	4–2	Hapoel Kiryat Haim	Jerusalem
	Davidoff 5'; Hasson 25', 70'; Babayoff 57'		14' Klein; 44' Moshe Handler	Stadium: YMCA Stadium; Attendance: 4,000; Referee: Rosenblum

19 May 1956 20	Beitar Jerusalem	1–0	Hapoel Jerusalem	Jerusalem
	Hasson 85'			Stadium: YMCA Stadium

27 May 1956 21	Beitar Jerusalem	0–2	Ahva Notzrit Haifa	Jerusalem
			35' Boulos; 89' Fadul	Stadium: YMCA Stadium; Attendance: 4,000; Referee: Wajim

2 June 1956 22	Hapoel Balfouria	0–1	Beitar Jerusalem	Balfouria
			48' Babayoff

==== Results by match ====
Round	1	2	3	4	5	6	7	8	9	10	11	12	13	14	15	16	17	18	19	20	21	22
Result	W	D	L	L	W	L	D	L	W	L	D	L	L	L	L	L	W		W	W	L	W
Position	5	4	6	9	6	7	8	8	7	8	9	9	9	10	11	11	12	12	11	10	11	10

Updated to match(es) played on 28 July 1956. Source: IFA
W = Win; D = Draw; L = Loss

=== Promotion/relegation play-offs ===
==== Table ====
Pos	Team	Pld	W	D	L	GF	GA	GD	Pts	Qualification
1	Beitar Jerusalem	3	3	0	0	8	2	+6	6	Liga Alef
2	Maccabi Sha'arayim	3	1	1	1	4	3	+1	3	Liga Alef
3	Maccabi Hadera	3	1	0	2	5	8	−3	2	Liga Bet
4	Ahva Notzrit Haifa	3	0	1	2	2	6	−4	1	Liga Bet
