= 1955–56 Hapoel Balfouria F.C. season =

Hapoel Balfouria
1955–56 season
- Stadium: Hapoel Ground, Afula
- Liga Alef (1955) Liga Alef (1956): 14th 12th
- State Cup: not completed

The 1955–56 Hapoel Balfouria season was the club's 13th season since its establishment, in 1942, and 8th since the establishment of the State of Israel.

At the start of the season, the league which started during the previous season was completed, with the club finishing 14th (out of 14), which meant the club relegated to the second division, which was renamed Liga Alef, and played in this division during the remainder of the season, finishing 12th (out of 12), relegating to the third division ahead of the next season.

== Match Results ==
=== Legend ===
Win Draw Loss

=== 1954–55 Liga Alef ===
The league began on 6 February 1955, and by the time the previous season ended, only 20 rounds of matches were completed, with the final 6 rounds being played during September and October 1955.

==== Final table ====
Pos	Club	P	W	D	L	GF	GA	GR	Pts	
9	Hapoel Haifa	26	9	6	11	40	55	0.73	24	
10	Hapoel Ramat Gan	26	10	3	13	35	41	0.85	23	
11	Beitar Jerusalem	26	8	5	13	37	59	0.63	21	Promotion/relegation play-offs
12	Hapoel Kfar Saba	26	6	6	14	38	46	0.83	18	Promotion/relegation play-offs
13	Hapoel Hadera	26	7	2	17	36	53	0.68	16	Relegated to Liga Alef
14	Hapoel Balfouria	26	3	2	21	32	129	0.25	8	Relegated to Liga Alef

==== Matches ====
3 September 1955 21	Hapoel Balfouria	1–8	Beitar Tel Aviv	Afula
	Bentov 85'	Report (p. 8)	27' Huli; 34', 39', 51', 57' (pen.), 79' Emaliah; 44', 56' Bar-Zion	Stadium: Hapoel Ground; Attendance: 600; Referee: Moshe Cohen

10 September 1955 22	Hapoel Balfouria	0–6	Maccabi Haifa	Afula
		Report (p. 8)	7' Hardy; 19', 82' Fuchs; 31' (pen.) Ben-Tzvi; 73', 88' Held	Stadium: Hapoel Ground; Attendance: 500; Referee: Markovich

24 September 1955 23	Hapoel Petah Tikva	13–2	Hapoel Balfouria	Petah Tikva
	Chirik 3', 23', 42'; Kofman 22', 73'; Markus 26', 53', 81'; Stelmach 28', 77', 85', 89'; Zelikovich 58'	Report (p. 8)	18' Dubnov; 57' Tal	Stadium: Hapoel Ground; Attendance: 500; Referee: Zahavi

1 October 1955 24	Hapoel Hadera	5–1	Hapoel Balfouria	Hadera
	Weinberg 21' (pen.); Halfon 51'; Afgin 63'; Piterman 65'; Gertner 85'	Report (p. 8)	73' Tal	Stadium: Hapoel Ground; Attendance: 500; Referee: Moshe Cohen

8 October 1955 25	Hapoel Balfouria	4–2	Beitar Jerusalem	Afula
	Kochavi 34'; Tal 38', 88'; Bentov 61' (pen.)	Report (p. 8)	41' Zion; 86' Elfasi	Stadium: Hapoel Ground; Attendance: 800; Referee: Scheindling

15 October 1955 26	Hapoel Haifa	3–1	Hapoel Balfouria	Haifa
	Diamant 35'; M. Simantiris 41'; Schneid 61'	Report (p. 8)	80' (o.g.) Ben-Nun	Stadium: Kiryat Eliezer Stadium; Attendance: 1,500; Referee: Zahavi

==== Results by match ====
Round	1	2	3	4	5	6	7	8	9	10	11	12	13	14	15	16	17	18	19	20	21	22	23	24	25	26
Result	L	L	L	D	L	L	L	L	D	L	W	L	W	L	L	L	L	L	L	L	L	L	L	L	W	L
Position	10	13	14	13	14	14	14	14	14	14	14	14	14	14	14	14	14	14	14	14	14	14	14	14	14	14

Updated to match(es) played on 15 October 1955. Source: 2 Dear Points
W = Win; D = Draw; L = Loss

=== 1955–56 Liga Alef ===
==== Final table ====
Pos	Club	P	W	D	L	GF	GA	GR	Pts	Notes
8	Maccabi Ramat Gan	22	7	6	9	31	34	0.91	20	
9	Ahva Notzrit Haifa	22	9	2	11	31	40	0.78	20	Relegation play-offs
10	Beitar Jerusalem	21	7	3	11	26	45	0.58	17	Relegation play-offs
11	Hapoel Ra'anana	22	6	4	12	20	49	0.41	16	Relegated to Liga Bet
12	Hapoel Balfouria	22	5	3	14	29	44	0.66	13	Relegated to Liga Bet

An 18th round match between Hapoel Nahariya and Beitar Jerusalem wasn't played due to misunderstanding between the teams regarding the time of the match, and was left unplayed at the end of the season.

==== Matches ====
3 December 1955 1	Hapoel Balfouria	0–4	Hapoel Mahane Yehuda	Afula
			11' Atwar; 33' Z. Ratzabi; 46' Gluska; 60' S. Ratzabi	Stadium: Hapoel Ground; Attendance: 400; Referee: Hoze

10 December 1955 2	Hapoel Rehovot	2–1	Hapoel Balfouria	Rehovot
	Yefet 28'; Garameh 44'		52' Tsalala

24 December 1955 4	Maccabi Ramat Gan	3–2	Hapoel Balfouria	Ramat Gan
	Saporta 12'; Barbalat 14', 32'		24' Mashiah; 67' Tal	Stadium: Maccabi Ground; Attendance: 700; Referee: Ben-Rubi

31 December 1955 5	Hapoel Kiryat Haim	3–0	Hapoel Balfouria	Haifa

7 January 1956 6	Hapoel Balfouria	1–3	Hakoah Tel Aviv	Afula

14 January 1956 7	Hapoel Balfouria	1–2	Hapoel Jerusalem	Afula

21 January 1956 8	Hapoel Hadera	4–2	Hapoel Balfouria	Hadera

4 February 1956 9	Ahva Notzrit Haifa	1–0	Hapoel Balfouria	Haifa

11 February 1956 10	Hapoel Balfouria	3–0	Hapoel Ra'anana	Afula

18 February 1956 11	Beitar Jerusalem	1–1	Hapoel Balfouria	Jerusalem
				Stadium: YMCA Stadium

3 March 1956 12	Hapoel Mahane Yehuda	1–1	Hapoel Balfouria	Petah Tikva
	Atwar 68'		25' Mashiah

10 March 1956 13	Hapoel Balfouria	2–0	Hapoel Rehovot	Afula
	Mashiah 15'; Kopler 75'

17 March 1956 14	Hapoel Nahariya	0–0	Hapoel Balfouria

24 March 1956 15	Hapoel Balfouria	2–1	Maccabi Ramat Gan	Afula
	Mashiah 40'; Tenenbaum 88'		18' Azani

31 March 1956 16	Hapoel Balfouria	4–0	Hapoel Kiryat Haim	Afula

7 April 1956 17	Hakoah Tel Aviv	3–1	Hapoel Balfouria

14 April 1956 18	Hapoel Jerusalem	4–0 (Note: The match was abandoned at the 70th minute after the referee sent two of Hapoel Balfouria players off. Hapoel Balfouria appealed the result and the match was set to be replayed, but eventually gave up its claims regarding the match.)	Hapoel Jerusalem	Jerusalem
	Yatzkan 14' (pen.); Fruchtman 40', 58'; Mizrahi 41'			Stadium: Katamon Stadium; Referee: Ben Yehuda

22 April 1956 19	Hapoel Balfouria	3–1	Hapoel Hadera	Afula

19 May 1956 20	Hapoel Balfouria	2–3	Ahva Notzrit Haifa	Afula

27 May 1956 21	Hapoel Ra'anana	3–1	Hapoel Balfouria

2 June 1956 22	Hapoel Balfouria	0–1	Beitar Jerusalem	Balfouria
			48' Babayoff

24 July 1956 3	Hapoel Balfouria	2–4	Hapoel Nahariya	Afula
	Mashiah 39'; S. Farkas 59'		18' (o.g.) Y. Farkas; 59' Gardosh; 69' Berkovic; 72' (pen.) Isaac	Stadium: Hapoel Ground; Attendance: 300; Referee: HaMeiri

==== Results by match ====
Round	1	2	3	4	5	6	7	8	9	10	11	12	13	14	15	16	17	18	19	20	21	22
Result	L	L	L	L	L	L	L	L	L	W	D	D	W	D	W	W	L	L	W	L	L	L
Position	12	12	11	12	12	12	12	12	12	12	12	12	12	11	10	10	9	11	10	12	12	12

Updated to match(es) played on 28 July 1956. Source: IFA
W = Win; D = Draw; L = Loss
