= 1954–55 Israel State Cup =

Tournament details
- Country: Israel

Final positions
- Champions: Maccabi Tel Aviv (8th Title)
- Runners-up: Hapoel Petah Tikva

The 1954–55 Israel State Cup (Hebrew: גביע המדינה, Gvia HaMedina) was the 18th season of Israel's nationwide football cup competition and the third after the Israeli Declaration of Independence.

Matches began on 22 January 1955, but was not concluded until the end of the 1954–55 season, and the later rounds were held in autumn 1955, at the beginning of the 1955–56 season. The final was held at the Basa Stadium in Tel Aviv on 19 November 1955. Maccabi Tel Aviv appeared in its fifth consecutive final and after defeating Hapoel Petah Tikva 3–1, won its 8th cup.

== Results ==
=== First round ===
First round matches were played between Liga Gimel teams. Matches were held on 22 January 1955. However, since there was a dispute between the Maccabi and Hapoel faction within the IFA, Maccabi teams declined to play their matches. These matches, completing the round, were played on 19 February 1955.

Home team	Score	Away team
Beitar Haifa	w/o	Hapoel Nes Tziona
Hapoel Even Yehuda	6–1 (a.e.t.)	Beitar Ramat Gan
Orthodox Haifa	3–1	Hapoel Tirat HaCarmel
Beitar Binyamina	1–2	Hapoel Ramla
HaPortzim Jerusalem	w/o	Hapoel HaMegabesh
Hapoel Jaffa	2–0	Shimshon Tel Aviv
Hapoel Bnei Brak/Kiryat Ono	2–1	Hapoel Saqiya Aleph
Hapoel Ever HaYarkon	w/o	Beitar Netanya
Hapoel Lod	w/o	Degel Zion Tel Aviv
Beitar Yehuda	w/o	Hapoel Hadar-Ramatayim
Kochav HaDarom Nes Tziona	1–4	Hapoel Mefalsim
Hapoel Herzliya	5–0	Hapoel Zvi Nahariya
Hapoel Azor	1–2	Maccabi Shmuel Tel Aviv
Hapoel Zikhron Ya'akov	2–7	Hapoel Be'er Ya'akov
Maccabi Lod	4–2	Maccabi Rosh Pina
Maccabi Holon	1–2	Maccabi Ein Ganim

=== Second round ===
Liga Bet teams entered the competition. Matches were held on 26 February 1955. Two ties went into a replay, and one, between Liga Gimel teams Hapoel HaMegabesh and Hapoel Be'er Ya'akov needed a further replay in order to be settled. The tie between Hapoel Nahariya and Hapoel Beit Lid also proved troublesome. While Nahariya won the match between the team 2–0, a walkover win was given to Beit Lid since the playing field in Nahariya was lacking a fence between the field and the stands. Nahariya appealed the decision and went to civil court in order to obtain an injunction forbidding any further cup matches until the matter is resolved. However, as in the month between the second and the third rounds the appeal was accepted and the original result was restored, there was no delay.

Home team	Score	Away team
Hapoel Rehovot	2–3	Hapoel Herzliya
Maccabi Sha'arayim	2–3	Orthodox Haifa
Hapoel Mefalsim	1–2	Bnei Yehuda
Maccabi Ramla	1–2	Hapoel Even Yehuda
Hapoel Ramla	0–2 (Note: The match was abandoned at the 70th minute due to a brawl between the players and the result stood.)	Maccabi Shmuel Tel Aviv
Hapoel HaMegabesh	1–1 (a.e.t.)	Hapoel Be'er Ya'akov
Maccabi Lod	0–3	Beitar Jaffa
Maccabi Ramat Gan	1–2	Hakoah Tel Aviv
Hapoel Bnei Brak/Kiryat Ono	3–0	Hapoel Acre
Hapoel Mahane Yehuda	4–2 (a.e.t.)	Hapoel Rishon LeZion
Maccabi Ein Ganim	3–0	Hakoah Haifa
Maccabi Zikhron Ya'akov	0–2	S.C. Atlit
Hapoel Netanya	2–5	Hapoel Jaffa
Hapoel Nes Tziona	3–0	YMCA Jerusalem
Hapoel Hadar-Ramatayim	0–1	Hapoel Ra'anana
Maccabi Jerusalem	1–0	Hapoel Lod
Hapoel Kiryat Haim	2–2 (a.e.t.)	Ahva Notzrit Haifa
Hapoel Jerusalem	w/o	Hapoel Ever HaYarkon
Maccabi Jaffa	5–1	Maccabi Hadera
Hapoel Nahariya	2–0	Hapoel Beit Lid

==== Replays ====
Home team	Score	Away team
Hapoel Be'er Ya'akov	0–0 (a.e.t.)	Hapoel HaMegabesh
Ahva Notzrit Haifa	4–2	Hapoel Kiryat Haim

As the tie between Hapoel Be'er Ya'akov and Hapoel HaMegabesh wasn't settled, a draw of lots were held, in which Hapoel Be'er Ya'akov won.

=== Third round ===
Most of Liga Alef teams, which entered the competition on this round, cruised to the next round. Maccabi Petah Tikva found Liga Gimel club Maccabi Shmuel Tel Aviv hard to beat, being saved by a 90th-minute goal to go through, and Hapoel Balfouria needed extra time to win at home against Hapoel Ra'anana. Most matches were played on 26 March 1955. Two matches, both scheduled to be played in Jerusalem, were postponed due to weather conditions and were finally played on 7 May 1955, both ending with surprise winners, as Liga Gimel club Orthodox Haifa thrashed Hapoel Jerusalem from Liga bet and Liga Aleph club Hapoel Kfar Saba crashing to Liga bet club (and former cup finalist and joint-holder) Maccabi Jerusalem.

Home team	Score	Away team
Hapoel Tel Aviv	5–0	Beitar Jerusalem
Maccabi Tel Aviv	6–0	Hakoah Tel Aviv
Maccabi Rehovot	1–2	Beitar Tel Aviv
Hapoel Petah Tikva	5–1	Maccabi Jaffa
Hapoel Mahane Yehuda	3–1	Hapoel Herzliya
Hapoel Jerusalem	2–5	Orthodox Haifa
Bnei Yehuda	3–1	Beitar Jaffa
Hapoel Be'er Ya'akov	0–2	Hapoel Jaffa
Hapoel Haifa	4–1	Hapoel Even Yehuda
Maccabi Petah Tikva	3–2	Maccabi Shmuel Tel Aviv
Maccabi Ein Ganim	2–3	Hapoel Hadera
Hapoel Balfouria	3–1 (a.e.t.)	Hapoel Ra'anana
Hapoel Nahariya	1–0	Ahva Notzrit Haifa
S.C. Atlit	1–2	Maccabi Netanya
Maccabi Jerusalem	2–1	Hapoel Kfar Saba
Hapoel Bnei Brak/Kiryat Ono	0–3	Hapoel Ramat Gan
Maccabi Haifa	9–1	Hapoel Nes Tziona

=== Fourth round ===
The 17 winners from the previous round were drawn to eight ties, with Hapoel Balfouria receiving a bye to an intermediate round. All matches were held on 28 May 1955.

Home team	Score	Away team
Hapoel Ramat Gan	2–1	Maccabi Netanya
Hapoel Hadera	1–0	Hapoel Tel Aviv
Maccabi Haifa	9–0	Orthodox Haifa
Hapoel Haifa	w/o	Maccabi Jerusalem
Hapoel Jaffa	1–2	Beitar Tel Aviv
Maccabi Tel Aviv	6–0	Bnei Yehuda
Hapoel Petah Tikva	7–0	Hapoel Nahariya
Maccabi Petah Tikva	4–1	Hapoel Mahane Yehuda

Bye: Hapoel Balfouria

=== Intermediate round ===
Of the eight fourth round winners, Hapoel Petah Tikva was drawn to play Hapoel Balfouria. The match was supposed to be played on 9 July 1955, but Balfouria withdrew and Petah Tikva was given a walkover win.

Home team	Score	Away team
Hapoel Petah Tikva	w/o	Hapoel Balfouria

=== Quarter-finals ===
The 1955–56 season opened with the task of completing last season's cup competition. Three of the four ties, all played on 27 August 1955, yielded a decisive result, with Maccabi Tel Aviv registering its third consecutive 6–0 win, while the other tie was only settled after extra time was played.

Home team	Score	Away team
Beitar Tel Aviv	0–4	Hapoel Petah Tikva
Maccabi Tel Aviv	6–0	Hapoel Hadera
Hapoel Haifa	0–4	Maccabi Haifa
Maccabi Petah Tikva	0–1 (a.e.t.)	Hapoel Ramat Gan

=== Semi-finals ===
22 October 1955

Maccabi Tel Aviv	5–0	Maccabi Haifa
Merimovich 36'; Cohen 40' (o.g.); Studinski 55', 73'; Glazer 88'

Petah Tikva
Attendance: 1,500
Referee: Ben Rubi

22 October 1955

Hapoel Ramat Gan	0–2	Hapoel Petah tikva
		Chirik 22'; Stelmach 86'

Basa Stadium, Tel Aviv
Attendance: 3,500
Referee: Sher

=== Final ===
19 November 1955

Maccabi Tel Aviv	3–1	Hapoel Petah tikva
Nahmias 8'; Glazer 35'; Studinski 68'		Kofman 84'

Basa Stadium, Tel Aviv
Attendance: 12,000
Referee: Friezner
