= Maccabi Ein Ganim F.C. =

Maccabi Ein Ganim
- Full name: Maccabi Ein Ganim Football Club מכבי עין גנים
- Founded: 1954; 1962 (reformed)
- Dissolved: 1955; 1963
- 1962–63: Liga Gimel Tel Aviv, 12th

Maccabi Ein Ganim (Hebrew: מכבי עין גנים), was an Israeli football club based in Petah Tikva.

== History ==
=== Establishment ===
In September 1954, a joint team of Hapoel Petah Tikva and Maccabi Petah Tikva departed Israel for a short tour in Cyprus. The tour was taken without authorization from the IFA, and the Hapoel footballers were told not to take part in the matches. The team, with Maccabi players only played three matches, against APOEL, Çetinkaya and Omonia, losing the first two matches and drawing the third.

In November 1954, Maccabi Petah Tikva faced disciplinary hearing over the matter, and was given a punishment of six months suspension. In response, the club's officials established a new team, Maccabi Ein Ganim, after one of Petah Tikva's neighborhoods and transferred the club's squad to the new team.

=== Club Activity ===
As during the first half of the season the IFA leagues were inactive due to disagreements between Hapoel and Maccabi, the newly formed team played friendly matches. In January 1955, Maccabi Petah Tikva resumed operations and Maccabi Ein Ganim became its daughter-club, and registered to play in Liga Gimel. During the following season, the club finished 5th in the league and progressed, after beating Hakoah Haifa from Liga Bet (second tier) 3–0 in the second round, to the third round of the cup, where it met top division's Hapoel Hadera and narrowly lost 2–3. After the season ended, the club folded.

In 1962, the club briefly reformed and played in Liga Gimel. However, club failed to appear for most of their second round fixtures and folded at the end of the season
