= 1954–55 in Israeli football =

Football in Israel
- Season: 1954–55

The 1954–55 season was the seventh season of competitive football in Israel and the 29th season under the Israeli Football Association, established in 1928, during the British Mandate.

== Domestic leagues ==
=== 1953–54 Liga Alef ===
Although league matches for the previous season ended on 13 March 1954, the confirmation of the league's final standings was delayed, as a match between Maccabi Haifa and Maccabi Petah Tikva, which was played on 26 December 1953 and ended with a 3–2 win for Haifa, was claimed to be fixed, to allow Maccabi Haifa to win. Eventually, on 10 January 1955, the IFA decided to replay the match in a neutral venue, Maccabi Haifa won the rematch 4–1 and secured their spot in the top division. However, with the IFA already deadlocked with an ongoing dispute between Hapoel and Maccabi, Beitar declared its resignation from the IFA in protest of the IFA decision to replay the Maccabi Haifa-Maccabi Petah Tikva match. Discussions were held with the help of Judge Yosef-Michael Lamm, and an agreement between the factions was reached on 28 January 1955, confirming the results of the season and reprieving Beitar Tel Aviv and Hapoel Balfouria from relegation.

==== Final table ====
Pos	Team	Pld	W	D	L	GF	GA	GR	Pts
1	Maccabi Tel Aviv (C)	22	16	6	0	59	11	5.364	38
2	Maccabi Petah Tikva	22	13	6	3	50	22	2.273	32
3	Hapoel Petah Tikva	22	12	3	7	55	25	2.200	27
4	Hapoel Tel Aviv	22	9	7	6	35	18	1.944	25
5	Maccabi Rehovot	22	6	9	7	30	33	0.909	21
6	Hapoel Ramat Gan	22	8	4	10	31	35	0.886	20
7	Maccabi Netanya	22	7	5	10	23	36	0.639	19
8	Maccabi Haifa	22	8	3	11	26	51	0.510	19
9	Hapoel Haifa	22	7	4	11	26	37	0.703	18
10	Hapoel Kfar Saba	22	8	1	13	27	38	0.711	17
11	Beitar Tel Aviv	22	7	3	12	23	42	0.548	17
12	Hapoel Balfouria	22	4	3	15	20	57	0.351	11

Source: 100 Years of Football 1906-2006, Elisha Shohat (Israel), 2006
(C) Champions

=== Shapira Cup ===
During the first half of the season, as no league matches were played, Hapoel Tel Aviv organized a league competition for the top Tel Aviv teams, Hapoel, Maccabi, Beitar and Maccabi Jaffa. The competition was played as a double round-robin tournament, with the top placed team winning the cup, named after former Hapoel Tel Aviv treasurer, Yosef Shapira.

==== League table ====
Pos	Team	Pld	W	D	L	GF	GA	GR	Pts
1	Hapoel Tel Aviv (W)	6	5	0	1	12	7	1.714	10
2	Maccabi Tel Aviv	6	4	0	2	16	8	2.000	8
3	Beitar Tel Aviv	6	2	0	4	7	8	0.875	4
4	Maccabi Jaffa	6	1	0	5	5	17	0.294	2

Source: Hadshot HaSport, p. 1
(W) Winners

==== Results ====
Home \ Away	BTA	HTA	MJA	MTA
Beitar Tel Aviv	—	1–2	2–0	2–1 (Note: Match was abandoned)
Hapoel Tel Aviv	2–1	—	2–1	2–1
Maccabi Jaffa	1–0	1–3	—	1–5
Maccabi Tel Aviv	2–1	2–1	5–1	—

Source: Hadshot HaSport, p. 1
Legend: Blue = home team win; Yellow = draw; Red = away team win.

=== 1954–55 Liga Alef ===
League matches were delayed until 6 February 1955, and by the time the IFA had gone to summer break, 20 rounds of matches were completed, delaying the end of the league season to the next season.

==== League table (as of 2 July 1955) ====
Pos	Team	Pld	W	D	L	GF	GA	GR	Pts
1	Maccabi Tel Aviv	20	14	3	3	68	20	3.400	31
2	Hapoel Petah Tikva	20	13	4	3	38	15	2.533	30
3	Hapoel Tel Aviv	20	9	8	3	37	17	2.176	26
4	Beitar Tel Aviv	20	9	5	6	48	36	1.333	23
5	Maccabi Petah Tikva	20	8	6	6	27	24	1.125	22
6	Maccabi Haifa	20	8	5	7	36	29	1.241	21
7	Maccabi Netanya	20	7	7	6	39	39	1.000	21
8	Hapoel Kfar Saba	20	6	6	8	29	30	0.967	18
9	Maccabi Rehovot	20	7	4	9	35	37	0.946	18
10	Hapoel Haifa	20	6	6	8	31	35	0.886	18
11	Hapoel Ramat Gan	20	7	3	10	23	27	0.852	17
12	Beitar Jerusalem	20	5	5	10	27	47	0.574	15
13	Hapoel Hadera	20	6	2	12	24	37	0.649	14
14	Hapoel Balfouria	20	2	2	16	23	92	0.250	6

Updated to match(es) played on 2 July 1955. Source: Hadshot HaSport, 3 July 1955 (in Hebrew)

== Domestic cups ==
The competition started on 22 January 1955, and by the end of the season reached the quarter-finals stage. The competition was completed during the next season.

== National Teams ==
=== National team ===
No official matches were played by the national team during the season.

== International club matches ==
=== Outgoing tours ===
==== Maccabi Tel Aviv tour of Italy ====
In August 1954, Maccabi Tel Aviv departed for a tour of Italy, intending to play Lazio, Torino, Roma and Napoli. However, the matches against Torino and Roma were cancelled, and the team returned home after playing just two matches in Italy and one more match, en route home, against RC Paris, which was Ernst Happel's first match for RC Paris.

29 August 1954	Lazio	0–0	Maccabi Tel Aviv	Rome
				Stadium: Stadio della Rondinella; Referee: (Italy) Giacomo Bertolio

12 September 1954	Napoli	7–1	Maccabi Tel Aviv	Naples
	Coccarelli 1'; Jeppson 4', 10'; Posio 26'; Vitali 35', 52'; Pesaola 43'		Merimovich 82'	Stadium: Stadio Arturo Collana

16 September 1954	RC Paris	1–1	Maccabi Tel Aviv	Paris
	Sénac 88'		Goldstein 64'	Stadium: Stade Olympique Yves-du-Manoir

==== Petah Tikva XI tour of Cyprus ====
On 24 September 1954 a team of players from both Hapoel Petah Tikva and Maccabi Petah Tikva departed for a tour of Cyprus, without the consent of the IFA. The Hapoel organization sent a telegram forbidding the participation of Hapoel players in any match, and the team played as Maccabi Petah Tikva. After returning to Israel, Maccabi Petah Tikva was banned for 6 months for its part of the tour, while Hapoel Petah Tikva received a fine of IL50.

25 September 1954	APOEL FC	2–1	Petah Tikva XI	Nicosia

26 September 1954	Omonia	2–2	Petah Tikva XI	Nicosia

28 September 1954	Çetinkaya	3–1	Petah Tikva XI	Nicosia

==== Maccabi Israel tour of England ====
A Maccabi XI, composed of the best players affiliated with Maccabi clubs, took a tour of England between 21 October and 7 November 1954. Maccabi lost all four matches during the tour and was criticized heavily for arranging the tour and the pick of its opponents.

26 October 1954	Arsenal	4–1	Maccabi XI	London
	Holton 20' (pen.), 28'; Milton 69'; Tapscott 70'		Israeli 76'	Stadium: Highbury; Attendance: 10,000

29 October 1954	Wolves	10–0	Maccabi XI	Wolverhampton
	Flowers 11'; Swinbourne 16', 60', 86'; Broadbent 19'; Hancocks 42', 62'; Wilshaw 50'; McDonald 63'			Stadium: Molineux; Attendance: 30,000

1 November 1954	Hull City	4–0	Maccabi XI	Hull
	Ackerman 15'; Reznik 22' (o.g.); Horton 56'; Downie 89'			Stadium: Boothferry Park; Attendance: 10,500

3 November 1954	Notts County	4–2	Maccabi XI	Nottingham
				Stadium: Meadow Lane

=== Visiting foreign teams ===
==== Beşiktaş ====
The visiting Turks met several composite teams, in Petah Tikva, a team from the local Hapoel and Maccabi teams, in Tel Aviv a team of the best Hapoel affiliated players and in Haifa a team from the Hapoel teams of Haifa, Kiryat Haim and Tirat HaCarmel.

19 September 1954	Petah Tikva XI	0–2	Beşiktaş	Petah Tikva
				Stadium: Hapoel Ground

22 September 1954	Hapoel XI	3–1	Beşiktaş	Tel Aviv
				Stadium: Basa Stadium

25 September 1954	Haifa Region Hapoel XI	1–2	Beşiktaş	Haifa
				Stadium: Kiryat Haim Stadium

==== Udarnik Sofia ====
Udarnik was invited to a return visit to Hapoel tour of Bulgaria during the previous season. The team arrived 8 October 1954 and played three matches in Israel. At the end of the tour, as the Bulgarians encountered problems with obtaining visas for a layover in Istanbul, a fourth match was arranged with mixed teams of Udarnik, Hapoel Tel Aviv and Maccabi Jaffa.

10 October 1954	Hapoel XI	0–3	Udarnik Sofia	Tel Aviv
				Stadium: Basa Stadium

12 October 1954	Tel Aviv XI	1–3	Udarnik Sofia	Tel Aviv
				Stadium: Basa Stadium

16 October 1954	Petah Tikva XI	2–3	Udarnik Sofia	Petah Tikva
				Stadium: Hapoel Ground

23 October 1954	Maccabi Jaffa/Udarnik	3–1	Hapoel Tel Aviv/Udarnik	Tel Aviv
				Stadium: Basa Stadium

==== APOEL FC ====
7 April 1955	Maccabi Tel Aviv	3–1	APOEL FC	Tel Aviv
				Stadium: Basa Stadium

9 April 1955	Maccabi Haifa	2–0	APOEL FC	Haifa
				Stadium: Kiryat Eliezer Stadium

11 April 1955	Jerusalem XI	2–2	APOEL FC	Jerusalem
				Stadium: YMCA Stadium

==== Associação Atlética Portuguesa ====
4 May 1955	Maccabi Tel Aviv	0–3	Portuguesa	Tel Aviv
				Stadium: Basa Stadium

7 May 1955	Hapoel Tel Aviv	0–4	Portuguesa	Tel Aviv
				Stadium: Basa Stadium

10 May 1955	Tel Aviv XI	0–4	Portuguesa	Tel Aviv
				Stadium: Basa Stadium

==== AC Omonia ====
27 May 1955	Petah Tikva XI	4–1	AC Omonia	Petah Tikva
				Stadium: Hapoel Ground

28 May 1955	Hapoel Kfar Saba	1–4	AC Omonia	Kfar Saba
				Stadium: Hapoel Ground

31 May 1955	Beitar Tel Aviv	4–2	AC Omonia	Tel Aviv
				Stadium: Maccabiah Stadium
