= 1954–55 Liga Bet =

Israeli football season

The 1954–55 Liga Bet season was the last in which Liga Bet was the second tier of Israeli football, as the new Liga Leumit became the top division and Liga Alef became the second tier.

Hapoel Kiryat Haim (North Division champions) and Maccabi Jaffa (South Division champions) qualify for promotion\relegation play-offs with the 11th- and 12th-placed clubs in Liga Alef.

== North Division ==
Pos	Team	Pld	W	D	L	GF	GA	GD	Pts	Qualification or relegation
1	Hapoel Kiryat Haim	20	15	1	4	89	25	+64	31	Promotion/relegation play-offs
2	Ahva Notzrit Haifa	20	10	7	3	38	25	+13	27	
3	Hapoel Nahariya	20	10	5	5	35	30	+5	25	
4	Hapoel Ra'anana	20	11	2	7	47	39	+8	24	
5	Hapoel Beit Lid	20	7	8	5	27	27	0	22	Relegated to Liga Bet
6	Hakoah Haifa	20	7	6	7	27	35	−8	20	Relegated to Liga Bet
7	Hapoel Acre	20	7	3	10	28	43	−15	17	Relegated to Liga Bet
8	Sport Club Atlit	20	6	5	9	33	49	−16	17	Relegated to Liga Bet
9	Maccabi Hadera	20	6	4	10	43	38	+5	16	Relegated to Liga Bet
10	Maccabi Zikhron Ya'akov	20	5	2	13	24	57	−33	12	Relegated to Liga Bet
11	Hapoel Netanya	20	3	3	14	30	53	−23	9	Relegated to Liga Bet

== South Division ==
Pos	Team	Pld	W	D	L	GF	GA	GD	Pts	Qualification or relegation
1	Maccabi Jaffa	22	16	4	2	73	21	+52	36	Promotion/relegation play-offs
2	Hakoah Tel Aviv	22	16	3	3	55	16	+39	35	
3	Hapoel Jerusalem	22	13	6	3	60	31	+29	32	
4	Hapoel Mahane Yehuda	22	11	4	7	56	42	+14	26	
5	Hapoel Rehovot	22	10	4	8	62	44	+18	24	
6	Maccabi Ramat Gan	22	9	3	10	41	34	+7	21	
7	Maccabi Jerusalem	22	8	6	8	37	42	−5	21 (Note: 1 point deducted)	Relegated to Liga Bet
8	Bnei Yehuda	22	9	3	10	36	44	−8	20	Relegated to Liga Bet
9	Maccabi Sha'arayim	22	6	3	13	21	42	−21	15	Relegated to Liga Bet
10	Hapoel Rishon LeZion	22	5	4	13	29	44	−15	14	Relegated to Liga Bet
11	Beitar Jaffa	22	5	4	13	29	54	−25	14	Relegated to Liga Bet
12	YMCA Jerusalem	22	0	4	18	23	97	−74	4	Relegated to Liga Bet

=== Promotion-relegation play-off ===
A promotion-relegation play-off between the 12th and 11th-placed teams in Liga Alef, Hapoel Kfar Saba and Beitar Jerusalem, and the winners of the regional divisions of Liga Bet, Maccabi Jaffa and Hapoel Kiryat Haim. Each team played the other three once.

22.10.1955

Hapoel Kfar Saba	3 – 1	Beitar Jerusalem

Netanya
22.10.1955

Maccabi Jaffa	4 – 1	Hapoel Kiryat Haim

Petah Tikva
29.10.1955

Hapoel Kiryat Haim	3 – 2	Beitar Jerusalem

Petah Tikva
29.10.1955

Hapoel Kfar Saba	1 – 1	Maccabi Jaffa

Haifa
5.11.1955

Hapoel Kiryat Haim	1 – 1	Hapoel Kfar Saba

Netanya
5.11.1955

Maccabi Jaffa	3 – 0	Beitar Jerusalem

Haifa

Pos	Team	Pld	W	D	L	GF	GA	GD	Pts	Qualification
1	Maccabi Jaffa	3	2	1	0	8	2	+6	5	Liga Leumit
2	Hapoel Kfar Saba	3	1	2	0	5	3	+2	4	Liga Leumit
3	Hapoel Kiryat Haim	3	1	1	1	5	7	−2	3	Liga Alef
4	Beitar Jerusalem	3	0	0	3	3	9	−6	0	Liga Alef
