= 1956–57 Israel State Cup =

Tournament details
- Country: Israel

Final positions
- Champions: Hapoel Petah Tikva
- Runners-up: Maccabi Jaffa

The 1956–57 Israel State Cup (Hebrew: גביע המדינה, Gvia HaMedina) was the 19th season of Israel's nationwide football cup competition and the fourth after the Israeli Declaration of Independence.

Although the competition began on 11 February 1956, it was delayed severely by the Suez Crisis, and later rounds were not played until April 1957, with the final being held on 6 July at 1957 at the Haifa Municipal Stadium in Haifa. Hapoel Petah Tikva met Maccabi Jaffa in the final and won the cup after securing a 2–1 win.

== Results ==
=== First round ===
74 of the 75 Liga Gimel clubs participated in this round. Most of the matches were drawn as divisional matches, with the exception of two matches.

| Home team | Score | Away team |
Upper Galilee division
| Maccabi Safed | w/o | Hapoel She'ar Yashuv |
| HaChalutz Safed | w/o | Hapoel Kiryat Shmona |
| Hapoel Kfar Giladi | w/o | Hapoel Lehavot HaBashan |
| Hapoel Safed | 6–5 | Hapoel Ayelet HaShahar |
Wester Galilee division
| Hapoel Kfar Ata | w/o | Beitar Acre |
| Hapoel Matzuva Hanita | 6–3 | Hapoel Beit HaEmek |
| Hapoel Kfar Hasidim | w/o | Hapoel Yehiam Kabri |
| Hapoel Zvi Nahariya | 4–1 | Hapoel Yas'ur |
Jordan Valley division
| Hapoel Kinneret | w/o | Hapoel Ma'agan |
| Hapoel Tiberias | w/o | Hapoel Afikim |
| Beitar Tiberias | w/o | Hapoel Yavne'el |
North division
| Atid Haifa | w/o | Beitar Pardes Hanna |
| Beitar Binyamina | 3–2 | Beitar Yehuda Haifa |
| Hapoel Givat Zaid | 6–1 | Hapoel Zikhron Ya'akov |
Samaria division
| Hapoel Givat Olga | 0–0 (Note: Due to infringements from both sides, the match result was annulled and both clubs were disqualified from the competition.) | Maccabi Meyasdim Hadera |
| Beitar Netanya | 2–1 | Hapoel Yanuv |
| Hapoel Burgata | w/o | Hapoel Kfar Yona |
| Hapoel Givat Haim | w/o | Hapoel Nahliel |
Sharon division
| Hapoel Neve Yamin | w/o | Hapoel Jaljulia |
Dan division
| Hapoel Jaffa | 9–1 | Beitar Bat Yam |
| Hapoel Bat Yam | w/o | Beitar Ramat Israel |
| Bar Kochva | w/o | Beitar Saqiya |
| Kadima Jaffa | 3–1 | Maccabi Bat Yam |
Middle division
| Hapoel Azor | 4–2 | Hapoel Holon |
| Terra Santa Jaffa | 2–0 | Beitar Beit Dagon |
| Hapoel Ganei Tikva | w/o | Beitar Holon |
| Hapoel Beit Dagon | w/o | Beitar Yehuda Jerusalem |
| Maccabi Holon | 2–0 | Kochav Or Yehuda |
Central division
| Hapoel Ramla | 5–0 | Hapoel Hadar Ramatayim |
| Hapoel Yehud | w/o | Hapoel Or Yehuda |
| Beitar Ramla | 4–1 | Beitar Lod |
| Kochav HaTzafon Jerusalem | w/o | HaKochav Lod |
South division
| Hapoel Be'er Sheva | w/o | Hapoel Marmorek |
| SK Nes Tziona | 7–0 | Hapoel Sha'arayim |
| Hapoel Be'er Ya'akov | 6–0 | Hapoel Shoval |
Inter-divisional matches
| Hapoel Lod | 2–1 | Hapoel Ever HaYarkon |
| Hapoel Herzliya | 2–0 | Kochav Nes Tziona |

=== Second round ===
| Home team | Score | Away team |
|---|---|---|
| Hapoel Herzliya | 8–0 | Hapoel Matzuva Hanita |
| Beitar Tiberias | w/o | HaChalutz Safed |
| Hapoel Burgata | w/o | Hapoel Kinneret |
| Beitar Binyamina | 4–2 | Atid Haifa |
| Hapoel Givat Haim | 3–3; R: 2–1 | Hapoel Givat Zaid |
| Hapoel Tiberias | 6–1 | Beitar Netanya |
| Hapoel Kfar Ata | 8–2 | Hapoel Neve Yamin |
| Hapoel Lod | w/o | Hapoel Kfar Hasidim |
| Hapoel Zvi Nahariya | 3–1 | Hapoel Be'er Ya'akov |
| Hapoel Kfar Giladi | 0–0; R: 3–0 | Maccabi Safed |
| Hapoel Be'er Sheva | 2–1 | Hapoel Azor |
| Beitar Ramla | w/o | Hapoel Ganei Tikva |
| Hapoel Ramla | 6–4 | Maccabi Holon |
| Bar Kochva | 2–0 | Hapoel Bat Yam |
| Hapoel Jaffa | 2–2; R: 5–1 | Kadima Jaffa |
| Hapoel Yehud | 3–1 | Hapoel Beit Dagon |
| Kochav HaTzafon Jerusalem | w/o | Terra Santa Jaffa |

- SK Nes Tziona and Hapoel Safed received a bye to the third round.

=== Third round ===
| Home team | Score | Away team |
|---|---|---|
| Beitar Binyamina | 2–1 | Maccabi Ramla |
| Hapoel Netanya | 3–2 | YMCA Jerusalem |
| Hapoel Kochav HaTzafon | 2–1 | Bar Kochva |
| Hapoel Givat Haim | 3–2 | Hapoel Kfar Giladi |
| Hapoel Rishon LeZion | 4–1 | Maccabi Jerusalem |
| Hapoel Ramla | 4–0 | Hapoel Mefalsim |
| Sport Club Atlit | 5–1 | Maccabi Sha'arayim |
| Hapoel Kfar Ata | 7–0 | Hakoah Haifa |
| Beitar Jaffa | w/o | Hapoel Beit Lid |
| Hapoel Tirat HaCarmel | 5–3 | Maccabi Shmuel Tel Aviv |
| Hapoel Tel Hanan | 2–1 | Maccabi Zikhron Ya'akov |
| Hapoel Jaffa | 2–1 | Hapoel Kiryat Ono |
| Hapoel Herzliya | w/o | Hapoel HaMegabesh |
| Hapoel Tiberias | 0–0; R: 3–0 | Maccabi Binyamina |
| SK Nes Tziona | 5–1 | Beitar Tiberias |
| Hapoel Even Yehuda | w/o | Beitar Mahane Yehuda |
| Shimshon Tel Aviv | 4–3 | Hapoel Safed |
| Hapoel Be'er Sheva | 3–0 | Hapoel Acre |
| Maccabi Hadera | 7–2 | Hapoel Burgata |
| Beitar Ramla | 3–1 | Bnei Yehuda |
| Hapoel Yehud | w/o | Hapoel Lod |

=== Fourth round ===
| Home team | Score | Away team |
|---|---|---|
| Beitar Ramla | w/o | Sport Club Atlit |
| Maccabi Hadera | 0–0; R: 4–1 | Hapoel Givat Haim |
| Hapoel Herzliya | 4–1 | Hapoel Even Yehuda |
| Hapoel Kfar Ata | 6–1 | Beitar Jaffa |
| Hapoel Netanya | 9–0 | Beitar Binyamina |
| Hapoel Ramla | 2–2; R: 3–1 | Hapoel Jaffa |
| Hapoel Tiberias | 7–2 | Hapoel Yehud |
| Kochav HaTzafon Jerusalem | w/o | Hapoel Be'er Sheva |
| Hapoel Rishon LeZion | w/o | Hapoel Tel Hanan |
| Shimshon Tel Aviv | 6–1 | Sektzia Nes Tziona |
| Hapoel Tirat HaCarmel | w/o | Hapoel Zvi Nahariya |

=== Intermediate Round ===
| Home team | Score | Away team |
|---|---|---|
| Shimshon Tel Aviv | 3–3; R: 3–3; R (2):3–2 | Hapoel Tiberias |
| Hapoel Kfar Ata | 4–4; R: 5–2 | Hapoel Herzliya |
| Hapoel Netanya | 2–0 | Hapoel Rishon LeZion |

=== Fifth round ===
| Home team | Score | Away team |
|---|---|---|
| Hapoel Haifa | 4–1 | Hapoel Ra'anana |
| Hapoel Jerusalem | 1–2 | Beitar Tel Aviv |
| Hapoel Petah Tikva | 6–0 | Maccabi Ramat Gan |
| Hapoel Tel Aviv | 6–0 | Beitar Ramla |
| Hapoel Hadera | 3–2 | Maccabi Hadera |
| Hakoah Tel Aviv | 2–1 | Hapoel Rehovot |
| Hapoel Ramat Gan | 1–1; R: 0–3 | Maccabi Tel Aviv |
| Maccabi Haifa | 4–1 | Maccabi Netanya |
| Maccabi Rehovot | 2–1 | Hapoel Nahariya |
| Beitar Jerusalem | 0–2 | Hapoel Balfouria |
| Hapoel Tirat HaCarmel | 3–0 | Hapoel Kiryat Haim |
| Hapoel Mahane Yehuda | 8–1 | Hapoel Netanya |
| Hapoel Kfar Saba | 4–3 | Hapoel Herzliya |
| Shimshon Tel Aviv | 2–1 | Hapoel Ramla |
| Maccabi Jaffa | w/o | Ahva Notzrit Haifa |
| Maccabi Petah Tikva | w/o | Kochav HaTzafon Jerusalem |

- Maccabi Jaffa, Maccabi Petah Tikva received a bye to the sixth round, as their opponents, Ahva Notzrit Haifa and Hapoel Kochav HaTzafon Jerusalem, folded.

=== Sixth round ===
| 8 June 1957 | Hapoel Haifa | 0–1 | Maccabi Haifa | Haifa Municipal Stadium |
| | | | Levi 77' | Referee: Dudai |

| 8 June 1957 | Hapoel Tel Aviv | 2–1 | Shimshon Tel Aviv | Basa Stadium, Tel Aviv |
| | Goldstein 35'; Rosenboim 38' | | Duhl ?' | Attendance: 4000; Referee: Ben-Rubi |

| 8 June 1957 | Maccabi Tel Aviv | 2–1 | Hapoel Mahane Yehuda | Maccabiah Stadium, Tel Aviv |
| | Israeli 38'; Pantilat 50' | | Atuar 57' |

| 8 June 1957 | Hapoel Tirat HaCarmel | w/o (Note: The match was set to be played at Tirat Carmel. However, the venues were switched days before the match and the sides weren't notified on time, making each side waiting for its opponent in its own ground. The league and cup committee ruled that Hapoel Petah Tikva won the match and advanced to the quarter-finals.) | Hapoel Petah Tikva |

| 8 June 1957 | Hapoel Kfar Saba | 7–3 | Beitar Tel Aviv |
| | Zhovel 3', 37', 51'; Kochavi 19', 40'; Tobiash 66'; Katz 74' | | Levi 57', 84'; Elmaliah 71' | Attendance: 2000; Referee: Frizner |

| 8 June 1957 | Maccabi Jaffa | 6–1 | Hapoel Hadera |
| | Ghouhasian; Arie; Schneor (pen.); Klemi | | Mansur |

| 8 June 1957 | Maccabi Rehovot | 2–1 | Maccabi Petah Tikva |
| | Beck 22', 60' | | Levkovich 29' | Attendance: 1000; Referee: Fried |

| 8 June 1957 | Hapoel Balfouria | 5–2 | Hakoah Tel Aviv |
| | Tenenbaum 11'; Tal 32'; Farkas 50', 53', 89' | | Sade 39'; Mistriyal 64' | Attendance: 600; Referee: Hoze |

=== Quarter-finals ===
15 June 1957

| Maccabi Tel Aviv | 2–0 | Maccabi Rehovot |
|---|---|---|
| Y. Glazer 33'; Rabinovich 86' |

Attendance: 2500
15 June 1957

| Hapoel Kfar Saba | 0–4 (a.e.t.) | Hapoel Tel Aviv |
|---|---|---|
| | | Glazer 96'; Michaelov 102', 107'; Tish 119' |

Referee: dudkevich
15 June 1957

| Maccabi Jaffa | 4–1 | Hapoel Balfouria |
|---|---|---|
| Schneor 34' (pen.); Turika 64'; Ghouhasian 74'; Arie 85' | | Langbord 7' |

15 June 1957

| Hapoel Petah Tikva | 2–1 | Maccabi Haifa |
|---|---|---|
| Kofman 22' (pen.); Nahari 26' | | Shlomo Levi 3' |

Attendance: 4000
Referee: Frizner

=== Semi-finals ===
22 June 1957

| Maccabi Tel Aviv | 2–2 (a.e.t.) | Hapoel Petah Tikva |
|---|---|---|
| Merimovich 57'; Matania 119' | | Nahari 39', 98' |

Haifa Municipal Stadium
Attendance: 8000
Referee: Werner

22 June 1957

| Hapoel Tel Aviv | 0–1 | Maccabi Jaffa |
|---|---|---|
| | | Kuytak 36' (o.g.) |

Basa Stadium, Tel Aviv
Attendance: 5000
Referee: Fried

==== Replay ====
22 June 1957

| Hapoel Petah Tikva | 2–0 | Maccabi Tel Aviv |
|---|---|---|
| Stelmach 12'; Mizrahi 75' |

Ramat Gan Stadium
Attendance: 15000
Referee: Werner

=== Final ===
6 July 1957

| Maccabi Jaffa | 1–2 | Hapoel Petah Tikva |
|---|---|---|
| Ghouhasian 57' | | Ratzabi 40'; Stelmach 59' |

Haifa Municipal Stadium
Attendance: 10000
Referee: Fried
