= Posio (surname) =

Posio is a surname. Notable people with the surname include:

- Celso Posio, Italian footballer
- Marigo Posio, 1882–1932), Albanian woman activist of the Albanian National Awakening and Independence Movement
- Yasmine Posio, Swedish politician and former member of the Riksdag
