= 1956–57 in Israeli football =

Football in Israel
- Season: 1956–57

Men's football
- Liga Leumit: Hapoel Tel Aviv
- Liga Alef: Hapoel Kfar Saba
- Liga Bet: Hapoel Balfouria; Shimshon Tel Aviv
- State Cup: Hapoel Petah Tikva

The 1956–57 season was the ninth season of competitive football in Israel and the 31st season under the Israeli Football Association, established in 1928, during the British Mandate.

== Review and Events ==
In September 1956, the national team participated in the inaugural AFC Asian Cup competition, finishing as runners-up.

In the penultimate round of Liga Alef, Hapoel Kfar Saba, who were leading the table, scored a 12–0 victory against Hapoel Nahariya, while its rival for promotion, Maccabi Rehovot score an 11–0 victory against local rival Maccabi Sha'arayim. The IFA set up a committee, headed by the IFA president, Yosef-Michael Lamm to investigate the results. After the investigation the committee decided to set promotion play-offs for the five teams involved in promotion battles. The play-offs were held after the summer break, at the beginning of the next season.

At the end of the league season, the top division was re-expanded to 12 teams. No club was relegated from Liga Leumit, while two teams were promoted (after the completion of the special promotion play-offs). The bottom club in Liga Leumit, Maccabi Jaffa entered a promotion/relegation play-offs again the third-placed club from 1956–57 Liga Alef. As Hapoel Jerusalem finished third in Liga Alef, prior to the committee's decision to hold the promotion play-offs, Maccabi Jaffa and Hapoel Jerusalem played the first match, resulting in a 1–1 draw. The second match was delayed and then cancelled as the committee ordered the play-offs.

== Domestic leagues ==
=== Promotion and relegation ===
The following promotions and relegations took place at the end of the season (including the Liga Alef promotion play-offs, played at the beginning of the next season):

Promoted to Liga Leumit

- Hapoel Kfar Saba
- Hapoel Jerusalem

Promoted to Liga Alef

- Hapoel Balfouria^{1}
- Maccabi Hadera
- Shimshon Tel Aviv
- Bnei Yehuda

Promoted to Liga Bet

- Hapoel Safed
- Beitar Netanya
- Hapoel Holon
- Sektzia Nes Tziona

Relegated from Liga Leumit

None

Relegated from Liga Alef

- Hapoel Nahariya
- Maccabi Ramat Gan

Relegated from Liga Bet

- Maccabi Zikhron Ya'akov
- Hapoel HaMegabesh Rishon LeZion
- Hapoel Mefalsim Sha'ar HaNegev

1. Hapoel Balfouria merged with Hapoel Afula. The merged team, although at times appearing as Hapoel Balfouria or Hapoel Afula/Balfouria, eventually retained the name Hapoel Afula and played with this name since.

== National teams ==
=== National team ===
==== 1956 AFC Asian Cup ====
Pos	Team	Pld	W	D	L	GF	GA	GD	Pts	Qualification
1	South Korea	3	2	1	0	9	6	+3	5	Champions
2	Israel	3	2	0	1	6	5	+1	4	Runners-up
3	Hong Kong (H)	3	0	2	1	6	7	−1	2	Third place
4	South Vietnam	3	0	1	2	6	9	−3	1	Fourth place

Source: RSSSF
(H) Hosts

==== 1956–57 matches ====
1 September 1956 AFC Asian Cup	Hong Kong	2–3	Israel	Hong Kong
19:00	Au Chi Yin 12', 66'		Glazer 37', 76'; Stelmach 69'	Stadium: Government Stadium; Attendance: 30,000; Referee: Sheppard (England)

8 September 1956 AFC Asian Cup	Israel	1–2	South Korea	Hong Kong
19:00	Stelmach 71'		Woo Sang-kwon 52'; Sung Nak-woon 64'	Stadium: Government Stadium; Attendance: 20,000; Referee: Trương Văn Ky (Vietnam)

12 Sept 1956 AFC Asian Cup	Israel	2–1	South Vietnam	Hong Kong
19:00	Stelmach 14', 27'		Trần Văn Tổng 58'	Stadium: Government Stadium; Attendance: 15,000; Referee: Tucker (England)
