= Bnei Yehuda Ground =

Former football ground in Tel Aviv, Israel

- Interactive map of Bnei Yehuda Ground
- Location: Tel Aviv, Israel
- Coordinates: 32°3′8.4″N 34°47′7.2″E

Construction
- Groundbreaking: 1944
- Opened: 1944
- Closed: 1951

Tenant
- Bnei Yehuda Tel Aviv (1944–1951)

Bnei Yehuda Ground (Hebrew: מגרש בני יהודה) was a football ground in south-east Tel Aviv, near Hatikva Quarter, Tel Aviv, Israel. The ground was in use between 1944 and 1951 and was abandoned when it was built over.

== See also ==
- Sports in Israel
