= Otto Gollnhuber =

Austrian footballer (1924–1963)

Personal information
- Date of birth: 9 February 1924
- Place of birth: Kapfenberg
- Date of death: 23 June 1963 (aged 39)
- Place of death: Frohnleiten
- Position: Forward

International career
Years	Team	Apps	(Gls)
- Austria

Otto Gollnhuber (9 February 1924 – 23 June 1963) was an Austrian footballer. He competed in the men's tournament at the 1952 Summer Olympics. He died in a car accident in 1963.
