= 1955–56 Liga Bet =

Israeli football season

The 1955–56 Liga Bet season was the first in which Liga Bet was the third tier of Israeli football due to the formation of Liga Leumit.

Maccabi Hadera (North Division champions) and Maccabi Sha'arayim (South Division champions) qualified for the promotion/relegation play-offs against the 9th- and 10th-placed clubs in Liga Alef.

== North Division ==
Pos	Team	Pld	W	D	L	GF	GA	GD	Pts	Qualification or relegation
1	Maccabi Hadera	22	–	–	–	–	–	—	35	Promotion/relegation play-offs
2	Hapoel Beit Lid	22	–	–	–	–	–	—	28	
3	Hapoel Netanya	22	–	–	–	–	–	—	26	
4	Sport Club Atlit	22	–	–	–	–	–	—	24	
5	Hapoel Even Yehuda	22	–	–	–	–	–	—	22	
6	Hapoel Acre	22	–	–	–	–	–	—	22	
7	Maccabi Zikhron Ya'akov	22	–	–	–	–	–	—	21	
8	Hapoel Tirat HaCarmel	22	–	–	–	–	–	—	19	
9	Beitar Mahane Yehuda	22	–	–	–	–	–	—	19	
10	Hapoel Tel Hanan	22	–	–	–	–	–	—	18	
11	Hakoah Haifa	22	–	–	–	–	–	—	15	Relegated to Liga Gimel
12	Maccabi Binyamina	22	–	–	–	–	–	—	1	Relegated to Liga Gimel

== South Division ==
Pos	Team	Pld	W	D	L	GF	GA	GD	Pts	Qualification or relegation
1	Maccabi Sha'arayim	22	–	–	–	–	–	—	33	Promotion/relegation play-offs
2	Maccabi Shmuel Tel Aviv	22	–	–	–	–	–	—	31	
3	Shimshon Tel Aviv	22	–	–	–	–	–	—	30	
4	Hapoel Rishon LeZion	22	–	–	–	–	–	—	27	
5	Beitar Jaffa	22	–	–	–	–	–	—	26	
6	Bnei Yehuda	22	–	–	–	36	30	+6	21	
7	Hapoel Bnei Brak\Kiryat Ono	22	–	–	–	–	–	—	20	
8	Maccabi Ramla	22	–	–	–	–	–	—	18	
9	Hapoel Mefalsim Sha'ar HaNegev	22	–	–	–	–	–	—	16	
10	Hapoel HaMegabesh Rishon LeZion	22	–	–	–	–	–	—	15	
11	Maccabi Jerusalem	22	–	–	–	–	–	—	14	Relegated to Liga Gimel
12	YMCA Jerusalem	22	–	–	–	–	–	—	7	Relegated to Liga Gimel

== Promotion play-offs ==
A promotion-relegation play-off between the 9th and 10th-placed teams in Liga Alef, Ahva Notzrit Haifa and Beitar Jerusalem, and the winners of the regional divisions of Liga Bet, Maccabi Sha'arayim and Maccabi Hadera. Each team played the other three once.

17 August 1956	Ahva Notzrit Haifa	0–3 (Note: Abandoned at the 70th minute with the score of 2–1 to Maccabi Hadera as Ahva Notzrit Haifa players protested awarding Hadera's second goal, which they claimed was stopped by the goalkeeper before the goal line.)	Maccabi Hadera	Kfar Saba
	Yehuda 3'	report (p. 6) (in Hebrew)	50' Karni; 70' Gvirzman	Stadium: Hapoel Ground; Attendance: 800; Referee: Sulami

17 August 1956	Beitar Jerusalem	1–0	Maccabi Sha'arayim	Tel Aviv
	Zion 88'	report (p. 6) (in Hebrew)		Stadium: Hatikva Neighborhood Stadium; Attendance: 1,500; Referee: Palman

25 August 1956	Ahva Notzrit Haifa	0–3	Beitar Jerusalem	Kfar Saba
		report (p. 6) (in Hebrew)	73', 87' Hasson; 83' Zion	Stadium: Hapoel Ground; Attendance: 1,000; Referee: Palman

25 August 1956	Maccabi Hadera	1–3	Maccabi Sha'arayim	Tel Aviv
	Gvirzman 54'	report (p. 6) (in Hebrew)	34' Tzuman; 46' Gamilel; 61' Madhala	Stadium: Hatikva Neighborhood Stadium; Attendance: 1,500; Referee: Sulami

1 September 1956	Beitar Jerusalem	4–2	Maccabi Hadera	Tel Aviv
	Ashkenazi 37', 48', 52'; Hasson 42'	report (p. 6) (in Hebrew)	44' Cohen; 84' Gvirzman	Stadium: Maccabi Jaffa Ground; Attendance: 500; Referee: Sulami

1 September 1956	Maccabi Sha'arayim	1–1	Ahva Notzrit Haifa	Tel Aviv
	Rokvan 3'	report (p. 6) (in Hebrew)	5' Y. Salim	Stadium: Hatikva Neighborhood Stadium; Attendance: 1,500; Referee: Palman

Pos	Team	Pld	W	D	L	GF	GA	GR	Pts	Qualification
1	Beitar Jerusalem	3	3	0	0	8	2	4.000	6	Liga Alef
2	Maccabi Sha'arayim	3	1	1	1	4	3	1.333	3	Liga Alef
3	Maccabi Hadera	3	1	0	2	5	8	0.625	2	Liga Bet
4	Ahva Notzrit Haifa	3	0	1	2	2	6	0.333	1	Liga Bet
