= Hans Menasse =

Austrian footballer (1930–2022)

Personal information
- Date of birth: 5 March 1930
- Place of birth: Vienna, Austria
- Date of death: 28 February 2022 (aged 91)
- Position: Right winger

Youth career
- Luton Town

Senior career*
Years	Team	Apps	(Gls)
1950–1958	First Vienna FC	109	(55)
1958–1959	Austria Wien	10	(3)

International career
1953–1954	Austria	2	(0)
- * Club domestic league appearances and goals

Hans Menasse (5 March 1930 – 28 February 2022) was an Austrian footballer who played as a right winger. Menasse, who was Jewish, was evacuated to the United Kingdom as a child, where he grew up, beginning his career at Luton Town. He played in two matches for the Austria national team from 1953 to 1954. Menasse died on 28 February 2022, at the age of 91.
