= Hatikva Neighborhood Stadium =

Football stadium in Tel Aviv, Israel

Coordinates: 32°03′00″N 34°47′13″E

Hatikva Neighborhood Stadium אצטדיון שכונת התקווה
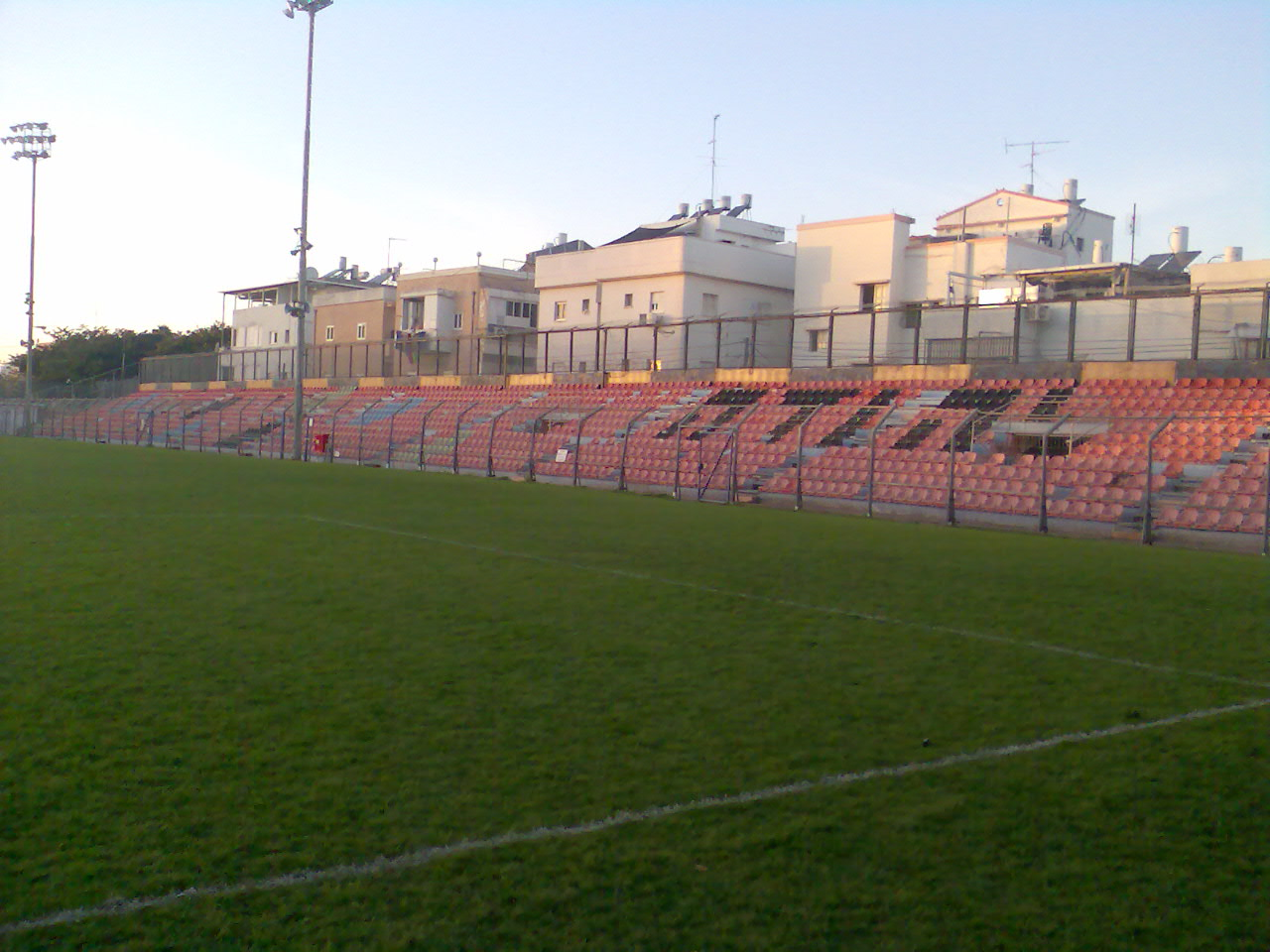
- Interactive map of Hatikva Neighborhood Stadium אצטדיון שכונת התקווה
- Location: 20 Kabir Street, Hatikva Quarter, Tel Aviv
- Capacity: 2,700
- Surface: Grass
- Public transit: Coastal Railway Line at Tel Aviv HaHagana

Construction
- Groundbreaking: 1951
- Opened: 1951

Tenants
- Bnei Yehuda Tel Aviv (1951–1962, 1975–2004, 2025-present); Hapoel Kfar Shalem (2010–2020, 2025-present); Beitar Tel Aviv (1983–1985); Beitar Shimshon Tel Aviv (2006–2011); Beitar Tel Aviv Ramla (2011–2013); Maccabi Kabilio Jaffa (2013–2020)

The Hatikva Neighborhood Stadium (Hebrew: אצטדיון שכונת התקווה, Itztadion Shkhunat HaTikva) is a multi-purpose stadium in the Hatikva Quarter of Tel Aviv in Israel.

== History ==
The stadium was built in 1951, when the former stadium of Bnei Yehuda was built over. The club was forced to find a different location and its members invaded an abandoned open space to the south of the Hatikva Quarter and built the stadium there. At first, the field was oriented north-south, but the club was forced to re-orient the stadium to south-north, as a building was built on the pitch's north edge.

In 1959, following Bnei Yehuda's promotion to the top division, the ground was renovated and the pitch was converted to a grass surface. A more massive renovation took place between 1965 and 1975, forcing the club to host matches in other venues while work was being done. Shortly before 2000, plastic seats were installed in the stadium's five main stands.

== Current status ==
Bnei Yehuda moved to play at the bigger Bloomfield Stadium in 2004, but their offices remain at the stadium. Between 2006 and 2013, second division club Beitar Tel Aviv played their home matches at the ground. Currently, the ground is home to Liga Leumit clubs Bnei Yehuda Tel Aviv and Hapoel Kfar Shalem

== See also ==
- Sports in Israel
