= 1955–56 Liga Alef =

Liga Alef
- Season: 1955-56
- Champions: Hakoah Tel Aviv
- Matches played: 132
- Goals scored: 430 (3.26 per match)

The 1955–56 Liga Alef season was the first in which Liga Alef was the second tier of Israeli football due to the formation of Liga Leumit, and was the first nationwide second tier season (replacing Liga Bet North and South regional divisions).

Hakoah Tel Aviv won the league and qualified for the promotion play-offs against Maccabi Jaffa (10th at the 1955–56 Liga Leumit).

League matches were completed on 2 June 1956, however, Hapoel Balfouria appealed the results which were set in its matches against Hapoel Nahariya (a walkover loss of 0–3) and Hapoel Jerusalem (which was abandoned with a score of 4–0 to Hapoel Jerusalem), as Balfouria could be spared from relegation with two wins in these matches. The first replayed match was played on 28 July 1956, and as Hapoel Balfouria lost 2–4 to Hapoel Nahariya, Balfouria gave up its claims regarding the match against Hapoel Jerusalem, agreeing to set the score to 0–4 to Hapoel Jerusalem.

An 18th round match between Hapoel Nahariya and Beitar Jerusalem wasn't played due to misunderstanding between the teams regarding the time of the match, and was left unplayed at the end of the season.

== Final table ==
Pos	Team	Pld	W	D	L	GF	GA	GD	Pts	Qualification or relegation
1	Hakoah Tel Aviv	22	17	2	3	47	19	+28	36	Promotion play-offs
2	Hapoel Kiryat Haim	22	13	4	5	60	30	+30	30	
3	Hapoel Jerusalem	22	9	7	6	38	33	+5	25	
4	Hapoel Rehovot	22	8	7	7	28	29	−1	23	
5	Hapoel Nahariya	21	7	8	6	40	36	+4	22 (Note: An 18th round match between Hapoel Nahariya and Beitar Jerusalem wasn't played due to misunderstanding between the teams regarding the time of the match, and was left unplayed at the end of the season.)	
6	Hapoel Mahane Yehuda	22	7	6	9	38	33	+5	20	
7	Hapoel Hadera	22	9	2	11	42	38	+4	20	
8	Maccabi Ramat Gan	22	7	6	9	31	34	−3	20	
9	Ahva Notzrit Haifa	22	9	2	11	31	40	−9	20	Relegation play-offs
10	Beitar Jerusalem	21	7	3	11	26	45	−19	17	Relegation play-offs
11	Hapoel Ra'anana	22	6	4	12	20	49	−29	16	Relegated to Liga Bet
12	Hapoel Balfouria	22	5	3	14	29	44	−15	13	Relegated to Liga Bet

== Relegation playoff ==
Liga Alef winner, Hakoah Tel Aviv face Liga Leumit 10th-placed club, Maccabi Jaffa. The matches took place on June 10 and 17, 1956.

9 June 1956

Maccabi Jaffa	3–1	Hakoah Tel Aviv
B. Cohen 32', 53'; Kalev 72'	Davar	74' Ashkenazi

Maccabi Jaffa Ground, Tel Aviv
Attendance: 5000
Referee: Reuven Frizner
16 June 1956

Hakoah Tel Aviv	0–1	Maccabi Jaffa
	Davar	18' Ghougasian

Hatikva Neighborhood Stadium, Tel Aviv
Attendance: 4000
Referee: Aharon Werner

Maccabi Jaffa won 4–1 on aggregate and remained in Liga Leumit. Hakoah Tel Aviv remained in Liga Alef.

== Relegation play-offs ==
A promotion-relegation play-off between the 9th and 10th placed teams in Liga Alef, Ahva Notzrit Haifa and Beitar Jerusalem, and the winners of the regional divisions of Liga Bet, Maccabi Sha'arayim and Maccabi Hadera. Each team played the other three once.

17 August 1956	Ahva Notzrit Haifa	0–3	Maccabi Hadera	Kfar Saba
	Yehuda 3'	report (p. 6) (in Hebrew)	50' Karni; 70' Gvirzman	Stadium: Hapoel Ground; Attendance: 800; Referee: Sulami

17 August 1956	Beitar Jerusalem	1–0	Maccabi Sha'arayim	Tel Aviv
	Zion 88'	report (p. 6) (in Hebrew)		Stadium: Hatikva Neighborhood Stadium; Attendance: 1,500; Referee: Palman

25 August 1956	Ahva Notzrit Haifa	0–3	Beitar Jerusalem	Kfar Saba
		report (p. 6) (in Hebrew)	73', 87' Hasson; 83' Zion	Stadium: Hapoel Ground; Attendance: 1,000; Referee: Palman

25 August 1956	Maccabi Hadera	1–3	Maccabi Sha'arayim	Tel Aviv
	Gvirzman 54'	report (p. 6) (in Hebrew)	34' Tzuman; 46' Gamilel; 61' Madhala	Stadium: Hatikva Neighborhood Stadium; Attendance: 1,500; Referee: Sulami

1 September 1956	Beitar Jerusalem	4–2	Maccabi Hadera	Tel Aviv
	Ashkenazi 37', 48', 52'; Hasson 42'	report (p. 6) (in Hebrew)	44' Cohen; 84' Gvirzman	Stadium: Maccabi Jaffa Ground; Attendance: 500; Referee: Sulami

1 September 1956	Maccabi Sha'arayim	1–1	Ahva Notzrit Haifa	Tel Aviv
	Rokvan 3'	report (p. 6) (in Hebrew)	5' Y. Salim	Stadium: Hatikva Neighborhood Stadium; Attendance: 1,500; Referee: Palman

Pos	Team	Pld	W	D	L	GF	GA	GD	Pts	Qualification
1	Beitar Jerusalem	3	3	0	0	8	2	+6	6	Liga Alef
2	Maccabi Sha'arayim	3	1	1	1	4	3	+1	3	Liga Alef
3	Maccabi Hadera	3	1	0	2	5	8	−3	2	Liga Bet
4	Ahva Notzrit Haifa	3	0	1	2	2	6	−4	1	Liga Bet

== Notes ==
1. Abandoned at the 70th minute with the score of 2–1 to Maccabi Hadera as Ahva Notzrit Haifa players protested awarding Hadera's second goal, which they claimed was stopped by the goalkeeper before the goal line.
