= Uri Weinberg =

Israeli footballer

Personal information
- Date of birth: 24 March 1937
- Date of death: 6 March 2012 (aged 74)

International career
Years	Team	Apps	(Gls)
1961–1962	Israel	2	(0)

Uri Weinberg (Hebrew: אורי וינברג; 24 March 1937 – 6 March 2012) was an Israeli footballer. He played in two matches for the Israel national football team from 1961 to 1962.
