= Celso Posio =

Italian footballer (1931–2016)

Personal information
- Full name: Celso Posio
- Date of birth: 26 April 1931
- Place of birth: Ostiano, Italy
- Date of death: 12 September 2016 (aged 85)
- Place of death: Cremona, Italy
- Position: Midfielder

Senior career*
Years	Team	Apps	(Gls)
1950–1954	Brescia	72	(9)
1954–1961	Napoli	198	(12)
1961–1962	Riunite Messina	1	(0)

International career
1957	Italy	1	(0)
- * Club domestic league appearances and goals

Celso Posio (Italian pronunciation: [ˈtʃɛlso ˈpɔːzjo]; 26 April 1931 – 12 September 2016) was an Italian footballer who played as a midfielder. On 26 May 1957, he represented the Italy national football team on the occasion of a 1958 FIFA World Cup qualification match against Portugal in a 3–0 away loss.
