= Avraham Palman =

Israeli footballer

Avraham Palman אברהם פלמן
Personal information
- Full name: Avraham "Buchka" Palman
- Date of birth: 23 September 1919
- Place of birth: Poland
- Date of death: 17 January 2000 (aged 80)
- Place of death: Israel
- Position: Defender

Youth career
- Hapoel Tel Aviv

Senior career*
Years	Team	Apps	(Gls)
1937–1938	Hapoel HaDarom Tel Aviv		
1938–1954	Hapoel Tel Aviv		

International career
1948–49	Israel	3	(0)
- * Club domestic league appearances and goals

Avraham Palman (Hebrew: אברהם פלמן) was an Israeli footballer, who played for Hapoel Tel Aviv and Israel.

== Biography ==
Palman started playing football at the age of 10 within the HaNoar HaOved VeHaLomed, before moving to Hapoel Tel Aviv's youth team. In 1937 Palman joined Hapoel HaDarom Tel Aviv, a farm team of Hapoel Tel Aviv. With Hapoel HaDarom, Palman played in the 1937 cup final, where his team lost to Hapoel Tel Aviv. A year later Palman was promoted to the senior Hapoel team, where he played as winger until he switched positions to defender in 1941. With Hapoel Tel Aviv, Palman won 2 championships and 2 cups. In 1954, Palman retired from active play, Staying with Hapoel Tel Aviv and was in charge of renovating of Basa Stadium, as well as acting as referee from time to time.

== Honours ==
- League Championships (2):
  - 1939–40, 1943–44, 1944–45 (joint championship)
- Cup (5):
  - 1938, 1939, 1944
