= 1954–55 Liga Alef =

Football league season

Liga Alef
- Season: 1954-55
- Champions: Hapoel Petah Tikva; 1st title
- Relegated: Beitar Jerusalem; Hapoel Hadera; Hapoel Balfouria
- Matches played: 182
- Goals scored: 676 (3.71 per match)
- Top goalscorer: Nisim Elmaliah (30)

The 1954–55 Liga Alef season was the last in which it was the Israel's top football league, as the following season it was replaced by Liga Leumit and became the country's second tier. It consisted of 14 clubs, the 12 from the top division in the previous season and two promoted clubs (Hapoel Hadera and Beitar Jerusalem). It used two points for a win and one for a draw.

The title was won by Hapoel Petah Tikva, the club's first championship, whilst Hapoel Hadera and Hapoel Balfouria (who had finished bottom the previous season) were relegated automatically. Beitar Jerusalem and Hapoel Kfar Saba took part in the promotion/relegation play-offs with the top two clubs from Liga Bet, in which Kfar Saba retained their place in the top division, but Beitar were relegated.

== Final table ==
Pos	Team	Pld	W	D	L	GF	GA	GR	Pts	
1	Hapoel Petah Tikva	26	18	4	4	68	23	2.957	40	Champions
2	Maccabi Tel Aviv	26	17	4	5	84	28	3.000	38	
3	Hapoel Tel Aviv	26	12	9	5	49	23	2.130	33	
4	Maccabi Netanya	26	13	7	6	54	43	1.256	33	
5	Beitar Tel Aviv	26	12	5	9	64	47	1.362	29	
6	Maccabi Haifa	26	11	6	9	54	41	1.317	28	
7	Maccabi Petah Tikva	26	10	7	9	37	41	0.902	27	
8	Maccabi Rehovot	26	11	4	11	49	48	1.021	26	
9	Hapoel Haifa	26	9	6	11	40	55	0.727	24	
10	Hapoel Ramat Gan	26	10	3	13	35	41	0.854	23	
11	Beitar Jerusalem	26	8	5	13	37	59	0.627	21	Relegation Playoffs
12	Hapoel Kfar Saba	26	6	6	14	38	46	0.826	18	Relegation Playoffs
13	Hapoel Hadera	26	7	2	17	36	53	0.679	16	Relegated to Liga Bet
14	Hapoel Balfouria	26	3	2	21	32	129	0.248	8	Relegated to Liga Bet

Source: 100 Years of Football 1906-2006, Elisha Shohat (Israel), 2006

== Results ==
Home \ Away	BEI	BTA	BLF	HHD	HHA	HKS	HPT	HRG	HTA	MHA	MNE	MPT	MRV	MTA
Beitar Jerusalem	—	3–3	6–1	4–2	3–0	1–0	2–1	0–1	2–2	1–0	1–4	1–1	4–3	1–4
Beitar Tel Aviv	4–0	—	6–1	4–1	4–2	1–1	2–1	3–0	1–1	0–2	2–1	3–0	2–5	1–3
Hapoel Balfouria	4–2	1–8	—	3–1	2–1	4–4	1–5	1–3	0–2	0–6	2–4	0–3	0–1	2–9
Hapoel Hadera	2–0	2–5	5–1	—	0–1	3–1	0–3	2–0	0–1	1–3	0–1	2–0	4–2	1–2
Hapoel Haifa	1–1	1–0	3–1	2–2	—	3–1	3–9	2–0	0–4	4–0	1–1	3–0 (Note: The match was abandoned at the 49th minute with Hapoel Haifa leading 2–0 as Maccabi Petah Tikva player Mordechai Lebe was sent off and refused to leave the pitch. The match was given as a walkover to Hapoel Haifa.)	1–1	1–2
Hapoel Kfar Saba	0–1	1–3	6–1	4–1	1–2	—	0–1	1–0	1–1	1–0	0–1	0–2	2–2	0–0
Hapoel Petah Tikva	2–0	4–0	13–2	3–1	3–1	1–1	—	0–2	1–0	1–1	1–1	1–0	3–0	2–1
Hapoel Ramat Gan	3–1	1–1	6–0	2–0	2–2	4–3	0–1	—	1–0	0–1	0–3	5–0	0–0	1–4
Hapoel Tel Aviv	1–1	3–0	8–1	2–0	1–0	0–2	0–1	2–0	—	1–1	1–1	1–1	1–1	2–1
Maccabi Haifa	5–0	1–1	1–1	3–2	4–1	2–1	1–3	1–3	0–3	—	6–2	0–1	4–0	1–3
Maccabi Netanya	3–2	3–1	6–1	0–1	2–2	1–2	0–3 (Note: The match was abandoned at the 80th minute with Hapoel Petah Tikva leading 1–3 as Maccabi Netanya supporters attacked the referee after he allowed a goal for Hapoel Petah Tikva which was thought to be an offside. The match was given as a walkover to Hapoel Petah Tikva.)	5–1	3–2	4–4	—	2–2	1–0	2–2
Maccabi Petah Tikva	2–0	4–2	2–1	1–1	3–0	5–4	1–1	1–0	1–4	3–3	0–1	—	0–2	2–1
Maccabi Rehovot	4–0	2–7	6–1	4–2	2–3	4–0	1–3	1–0	1–4	3–2	0–1	1–0	—	2–1
Maccabi Tel Aviv	6–0	3–0 (Note: The match was abandoned at the 37th minute with Maccabi Tel Aviv leading 2–0 as Beitar Tel Aviv player Ya'akov Gambash was sent off and refused to leave the pitch. The match was given as a walkover to Maccabi Tel Aviv.)	12–0	1–0	6–0	2–1	2–1	6–0	2–2	1–2	6–1	2–2	2–1	—

Source: 100 Years of Football 1906-2006, Elisha Shohat (Israel), 2006
Legend: Blue = home team win; Red = away team win.

== Positions by round ==
The table lists the positions of teams after each week of matches. In order to preserve chronological evolvements, any postponed matches are not included to the round at which they were originally scheduled, but added to the full round they were played immediately afterwards. For example, if a match is scheduled for matchday 13, but then postponed and played between days 16 and 17, it will be added to the standings for day 17.

Team ╲ Round	1	2	3	4	5	6	7	8	9	10	11	12	13	14	15	16	17	18	19	20	21	22	23	24	25	26
Hapoel Petah Tikva	3	4	3	3	1	1	1	1	1	1	1	1	1	1	1	1	1	1	2	2	2	2	2	1	1	1
Maccabi Tel Aviv	5	2	2	2	3	2	2	2	2	2	2	2	2	2	2	2	2	2	1	1	1	1	1	2	2	2
Hapoel Tel Aviv	2	1	1	1	2	3	3	3	5	4	4	5	5	5	3	3	3	3	3	3	3	3	3	3	3	3
Maccabi Netanya	9	11	13	14	13	13	12	10	10	8	10	8	7	7	7	8	8	7	7	7	7	6	5	4	4	4
Beitar Tel Aviv	1	3	5	4	4	6	5	4	3	3	3	3	4	4	5	5	5	5	4	4	4	4	6	7	6	5
Maccabi Haifa	11	12	12	12	12	12	13	13	12	13	9	11	11	10	8	6	7	6	6	6	6	5	4	5	5	6
Maccabi Petah Tikva	11	14	10	6	10	10	7	5	4	5	5	4	3	3	4	4	4	4	5	5	5	7	7	6	7	7
Maccabi Rehovot	5	7	8	10	9	9	8	9	11	12	13	13	13	13	13	13	13	11	11	9	9	8	8	8	8	8
Hapoel Haifa	7	6	6	8	7	5	6	7	7	7	7	7	8	9	9	10	9	10	10	10	10	9	11	11	10	9
Hapoel Ramat Gan	14	9	9	11	8	11	11	8	9	11	8	10	12	12	12	11	10	9	9	11	11	10	9	9	9	10
Beitar Jerusalem	7	10	7	9	11	8	10	12	8	10	12	9	10	8	11	12	12	13	13	12	12	11	10	10	11	11
Hapoel Kfar Saba	3	5	4	5	5	4	4	6	6	6	6	6	6	6	6	7	6	8	8	8	8	12	12	12	12	12
Hapoel Hadera	13	8	11	7	6	7	9	11	13	9	11	12	9	11	10	9	11	12	12	13	13	13	13	13	13	13
Hapoel Balfouria	9	13	14	13	14	14	14	14	14	14	14	14	14	14	14	14	14	14	14	14	14	14	14	14	14	14

Champions
Qualification to relegation play-offs
Relegation to 1955–56 Liga Bet

== Top goalscorers ==
Pos	Player	Club	Goals
1	Nisim Elmaliah	Beitar Tel Aviv	30
2	Nahum Stelmach	Hapoel Petah Tikva	27
3	Yehoshua Glazer	Maccabi Tel Aviv	26
4	Simon Elfasi	Beitar Jerusalem	16
4	Itzhak Caspi	Maccabi Netanya	16
4	Avraham "Huli" Levi	Beitar Tel Aviv	16
4	Moshe Litvak	Maccabi Rehovot	16
8	Boaz Kofman	Hapoel Petah Tikva	15
9	Max Cohen	Maccabi Netanya	14
9	Zvi Studinski	Maccabi Tel Aviv	14
9	Rehavia Rosenbaum	Hapoel Tel Aviv	14

^{Source:}

== Promotion-relegation play-off ==
A promotion-relegation play-off between the 12th and 11th-placed teams in Liga Alef, Hapoel Kfar Saba and Beitar Jerusalem, and the winners of the regional divisions of Liga Bet, Maccabi Jaffa and Hapoel Kiryat Haim. Each team played the other three once.

22 October 1955	Hapoel Kfar Saba	3–1	Beitar Jerusalem	Netanya
	Avrutski 5'; Ratz 26'; Glazer 33'	Report (p. 8)	7' Elfasi	Stadium: Sar-Tov Stadium; Attendance: 4,000; Referee: Reuven Frizner

22 October 1955	Maccabi Jaffa	4–1	Hapoel Kiryat Haim	Petah Tikva
	Aroyo 36'; Miranda 78', 84'; B. Cohen 79'	Report (p. 8)	34' Handler	Stadium: Maccabi Ground; Attendance: 6,000; Referee: Aharon Werner

29 October 1955	Hapoel Kiryat Haim	3–2	Beitar Jerusalem	Petah Tikva
	Handler 14', 40'; Havinski 25'	Report (p. 8)	6' Zion; 29' Elfasi	Stadium: Hapoel Ground; Attendance: 1,000; Referee: Arie Ben-Rubi

29 October 1955	Hapoel Kfar Saba	1–1	Maccabi Jaffa	Haifa
	Glazer 58'	Report (p. 8)	59' B. Cohen	Stadium: Kiryat Eliezer Stadium; Attendance: 5,000; Referee: Avraham Sher

5 November 1955	Hapoel Kiryat Haim	1–1	Hapoel Kfar Saba	Netanya
	Hayat 47'	Report (p. 8)	78' Morovich	Stadium: Sar-Tov Stadium; Attendance: 2,500; Referee: Reuven Frizner

5 November 1955	Maccabi Jaffa	3–0	Beitar Jerusalem	Haifa
	B. Cohen 34'; Miranda 41'; Kalev 53'	Report (p. 8)		Stadium: Kiryat Eliezer Stadium; Attendance: 3,000; Referee: Nahman Cohen

Pos	Team	Pld	W	D	L	GF	GA	GR	Pts	
1	Maccabi Jaffa	3	2	1	0	8	2	4.000	5	Placed in Liga Leumit
2	Hapoel Kfar Saba	3	1	2	0	5	3	1.667	4	Placed in Liga Leumit
3	Hapoel Kiryat Haim	3	1	1	1	5	7	0.714	3	Placed in Liga Alef
4	Beitar Jerusalem	3	0	0	3	3	9	0.333	0	Placed in Liga Alef

Updated to match(es) played on 15 October 1955. Source: 100 Years of Football 1906-2006, Elisha Shohat (Israel), 2006
