= Ahva Notzrit Haifa F.C. =

Ahva Notzrit Haifa
- Full name: Ahva Notzrit Haifa Football Club אחוה נוצרית חיפה
- Founded: 1949
- Dissolved: 1956
- 1955–56: Liga Alef, 9th (Relegated)

Ahva Notzrit Haifa (Hebrew: אחוה נוצרית חיפה, lit. Christian Brotherhood Haifa), also known as Ahvat Notzrim Haifa (Hebrew: אחוות נוצרים חיפה), was an Israeli football club based in Haifa. The club was the first Israeli Arab club to play in the second tier of Israeli football league system.

== History ==
The club was founded in 1949 and played their first season in Liga Meuhedet, the temporary second tier in the 1949–50 season, where they finished seventh out of nine in the Samaria division and relegated to Liga Gimel. In the 1951–52 season, the club won Liga Gimel Haifa division and was promoted to Liga Bet, the second tier at the time. In the 1953–54 season, the club finished fourth in Liga Bet North division, and in the following season, reached their best placing ever, when they finished runners-up, four points behind the league winners, Hapoel Kiryat Haim. Thanks to their high placing, Ahva Notzrit were placed in Liga Alef, which became the new second tier in the 1955–56 season, following restructuring of the Israeli football league system. In Liga Alef, the club finished ninth, and went to compete in the Relegation play-offs against the tenth placed club, Beitar Jerusalem and the regional winners of Liga Bet, Maccabi Sha'arayim and Maccabi Hadera. Ahva Notzrit lost 1–2 to Maccabi Hadera and 0–3 to Beitar Jerusalem, and in the last match, drew 1–1 with Maccabi Sha'arayim and relegated to Liga Bet. Following relegation, Ahva Notzrit was dissolved, and all the club players were released.

== Honours ==
- Second tier:
  - Runners-up (1): 1954–55
- Third tier:
  - Winners (1): 1951–52
