= Hapoel Balfouria F.C. =

Hapoel Balfouria
- Full name: Hapoel Balfouria Football Club הפועל בלפוריה
- Founded: 1945
- Dissolved: 1965
- Ground: Hapoel Afula Ground, Afula
- 1964–65: Liga Gimel Valleys, 11th

Hapoel Balfouria (Hebrew: הפועל בלפוריה) was an Israeli football club based in Balfouria. The club spent two seasons in the top division in the mid-1950s, finishing at the bottom on both occasions.

== History ==
Hapoel were promoted to Liga Alef (then the top division) in 1953. In their first season at the top level they finished last, with only four wins in 22 matches. However, they were not relegated as the top flight was expanded to 14 clubs with the establishment of Liga Leumit in 1954. The 1954–55 season saw the club again finish last. They conceded 129 goals, still a league record, and twice lost by more than 10 goals (2–13 to Hapoel Petah Tikva and 0–12 at Maccabi Tel Aviv). At the end of the season they were relegated to Liga Alef, and in the following season, they suffered subsequent relegation to Liga Bet. in 1956–57 they won the North division of Liga Bet and made an immediate return to Liga Alef.

Home matches of the club were played in Afula, as also, prior to their second season in the top flight, at the summer of 1954, the club merged with local football club, Hapoel Afula.

In the Israel State Cup, the biggest achievement of the club was reaching the Quarter-finals in the 1956–57 season. after 5–2 victory over Hakoah Tel Aviv in the round of 16, Balfouria was defeated 1–4 by Maccabi Jaffa in the Quarter-finals.

In the 1957–58 season, while playing in the second division, the club was officially known as Hapoel Afula, although they were mentioned by the press in both Hapoel Balfouria and Hapoel Afula names. The club continued to play as Hapoel Afula, and the name of Balfouria was dropped.

In the 1963–64 season, there was an attempt to revive the club. However, that attempt was short-lived, as the re-established club existed for two seasons only, finishing second bottom and bottom respectively in Liga Gimel Valleys Division. Furthermore, up to the double season of 1966–68, another club consisting of former players, Hapoel Vatikei Balfouria (lit. Hapoel Balfouria Veterans) operated in Balfouria. No football club operated in Balfouria ever since.

== Honours ==
=== League ===
Honour	No.	Years
Second tier	1	1951–52
Third tier	1	1956–57
