= Hapoel Ground, Petah Tikva =

Football stadium in Petah Tikva, Israel

- Interactive map of Hapoel Ground, Petah Tikva
- Full name: Hapoel Sports Ground, Petah Tikva
- Location: Petah Tikva, Israel
- Coordinates: 32°5′33.6″N 34°53′36.6″E

Construction
- Opened: 1940
- Closed: 1967

Tenant
- Hapoel Petah Tikva (1940–1967)

Hapoel Ground, Petah Tikva (Hebrew: מגרש הפועל פתח תקווה) was a football stadium in Petah Tikva, on Abravanel street. The ground was in use between 1940 and 1967, when the team moved to the Municipal Stadium.

== See also ==
- Sports in Israel
