= Hapoel Nahariya F.C. =

Israeli football club

Hapoel Nahariya
- Full name: Hapoel Nahariya Football Club הפועל נהריה
- Founded: 1940s
- Dissolved: 2022
- Ground: Municipal Stadium, Nahariya
Home colours	Away colours

Hapoel Nahariya (Hebrew: הפועל נהריה) was an Israeli football club based in Nahariya. The club played in Liga Gimel Upper Galilee division.

== History ==
The club's most notable result, which is considered to be the biggest upset in the history of Israeli football, came at the Round of 16 of the 1962–63 Israel State Cup, when Hapoel Nahariya, which played in Liga Bet, the third tier of Israeli football at the time, defeated Maccabi Tel Aviv 1–0, with a late goal by Rafi Shushan. They were eliminated in the Quarter-finals, following a defeat of 3–5 to the Israeli champions at the time, Hapoel Petah Tikva.

Hapoel Nahariya spent 12 seasons in the second tier of Israeli football. They have reached the second tier for the first time in the 1953–54 season, where they placed fifth in the North division. In the following season, the club reached their best placing to date, after they finished third in Liga Alef North division. In the 1956–57 season they finished second bottom, and relegated to Liga Bet. The club returned to Liga Alef, after they finished third in the 1962–63 Liga Bet North A division, and relegated back to Liga Bet after another second bottom finish at the following season. Two seasons later, Hapoel won Liga Bet North A division, however, history repeated itself, and they were relegated in the following season (which was the "double season" of 1966–68), after yet another second bottom finish. In the 1969–70 season the club won Liga Bet North A division once again, and promoted to Liga Alef. This time, their return to Liga Alef was successful, as they finished the 1970–71 season in the fifth place in Liga Alef North, and remained in the second tier until 1976, when Liga Artzit was created and became the new second tier of Israeli football, whilst Liga Alef became the third tier. Hapoel played in Liga Alef until the 1981–82 season, when they finished bottom and relegated to Liga Bet. They did not return to the third tier of Israeli football ever since.

Currently, the club plays in Liga Gimel, the fifth and lowest tier of Israeli football, after they were relegated from Liga Bet in the 2010–11 season, following a defeat of 0–1 to Ihud Bnei Majd al-Krum in the relegation play-offs.

The last season the club played was the 2021–22 Liga Gimel season, after which the club merged into Liga Bet club Beitar Nahariya F.C..

== Hapoel Zvi Nahariya ==
Hapoel Zvi Nahariya was the club's reserve team, named after Harry Zvi Levi, which was on the club's board in its early years. Later, the team was made of youth players and was assigned to the youth leagues, playing mainly in the northern district leagues.

== Honours ==
=== League ===
Honour	No.	Years
Third tier	1	1965–66, 1969–70
