= Hakoah Tel Aviv F.C. =

Hakoah Tel Aviv
- Full name: Hakoah Tel Aviv Football Club
- Founded: 1934
- Dissolved: 1962
- 1961–62: Liga Alef, 1st (Promoted)

Hakoah Tel Aviv (Hebrew: הכח תל אביב) was an Israeli football club based in Tel Aviv. In 1959 it merged with Maccabi Ramat Gan to form Hakoah Maccabi Ramat Gan, However, the club was renamed in 1962.

== History ==
The club was founded in 1934 by a group of former Hakoah Berlin players who had immigrated to Palestine from Germany and joined the Palestine League for the 1934–35 season and finishing as runners-up the following season. The club remained in the top division until the end of the 1944–45 season, when the club finished bottom of the league as relegated to the second division. In 1935, the club qualified to the cup final, but lost the final to Maccabi Petah Tikva.

In 1943, a separate club, Hakoah 1909 Tel Aviv, was founded by former Hakoah Vienna players. Following the club's relegation to the second division, the clubs merged and kept name Hakoah Tel Aviv.

In the first post-independence season, the club played in the Tel Aviv Division of Liga Meuhedet. The following season, 1951–52 (there was no league football in the 1950–51 season) they were placed in the South Division of Liga Bet, finishing fourth. In 1954–55 they missed out on the league title by a point, finishing as runners-up to Maccabi Jaffa, which were promoted to the top division after play-offs. The following season Hakoah played Maccabi Jaffa in a promotion/relegation match, with Jaffa winning 4–1 on aggregate. In the following season, they also failed in the promotion/relegation play-offs.

At the end of the 1958–59 season, in which they finished third, the club merged with Maccabi Ramat Gan, Although Hakoah Tel Aviv name was kept until the end of the 1961–62 season, in which they won Liga Alef and were promoted to the top division, Liga Leumit.

The club was renamed at the beginning of the 1962–63 season in Liga Leumit, from Hakoah Tel Aviv to Hakoah Maccabi Ramat Gan. The new club played at Maccabi's Gali Gil stadium in Ramat Gan.

== Honours ==
=== League ===
Honour	No.	Years
Second tier	2	1955–56, 1961–62
