= Hapoel Kiryat Haim F.C. =

Hapoel Kiryat Haim
- Full name: Hapoel Kiryat Haim Football Club הפועל קרית חיים
- Founded: 1936
- Ground: Thomas D'Alesandro Stadium, Kiryat Haim
- Chairman: Amitay Ben Zaken
- Manager: Reuven Ben Arush
- League: Liga Gimel Samaria
- 2018–19: 9th

Hapoel Kiryat Haim (Hebrew: הפועל קרית חיים) is an Israeli football club based in the Haifa suburb of Kiryat Haim. The club plays its home matches at the Thomas D'Alesandro Stadium.

== History ==
The club's first inscription was founded in 1936. During its early days, Hapoel Kiryat Haim played mostly against other Haifa region teams and military teams.

In the first post-independence season, the club won the North Division of Liga Meuhedet, the temporary second tier in the 1949–50 season, and in the following season, 1951–52 (there was no league football in the 1950–51 season), they were placed in the North Division of Liga Bet. In the 1954–55 season, the club won Liga Bet North division and qualified for the promotion play-offs for the newly formed Israeli top division, Liga Leumit, where they faced the South division winners, Maccabi Jaffa and the 11th and 12th placed clubs in the 1954–55 Liga Alef, Beitar Jerusalem and Hapoel Kfar Saba. Hapoel Kiryat Haim were not promoted after they finished third in the play-offs, and were placed in Liga Alef, which became the second tier of Israeli football at the 1955–56 season. In Liga Alef, Hapoel Kiryat Haim finished runners-up in the 1955–56 and 1958–59 seasons, and third placed in the 1961–62, 1965–66 and 1966–68 seasons. At the end of the 1969–70 season, they finished second bottom in Liga Alef North division and relegated to Liga Bet. In 1970–71 The club made an immediate return to Liga Alef, after they won Liga Bet North B division. However, in the following season, they finished bottom in Liga Alef North and dropped back to Liga Bet. The club suffered further relegation in 1974–75, this time to Liga Gimel, after they finished second bottom in Liga Bet North A division.

The senior team folded in 1976, and all of its players were released and were free to join other clubs, although the youth section of the club was still maintained. In 1980, the youth section was the only football activity of Hapoel Kiryat Haim, when the sports club faced deep financial crisis and was on the verge of closure. In spite of that, the senior team was re-established at the summer of 1980, and was promoted from Liga Dalet to Liga Gimel at the end of the season. However, at the summer of 1981, Hapoel Kiryat Haim merged with Liga Bet club, Hapoel HaTzair Haifa, to form Hapoel HaTzair Kiryat Haim. After several seasons playing in Liga Gimel, now the fifth and lowest tier of Israeli football, the merged club was also folded.

=== Resurfacing ===
In the beginning of the 2015/16 season, a group of local neighborhood restaurant owners decided to resurrect the club.

== Honours ==
=== League ===
| Honour | No. | Years |
|---|---|---|
| Second tier | 2 | 1949–50, 1954–55 |
| Third tier | 1 | 1970–71 |
| Fifth tier | 1 | 1986–87^{1} |

^{1}As Hapoel HaTzair Kiryat Haim
