= Maccabi Ramat Gan F.C. =

Maccabi Ramat Gan
- Full name: Maccabi Ramat Gan Football Club
- Founded: 1939
- Dissolved: 1968
- Ground: Gali Gil, Ramat Gan
- 1966–68: Liga Bet South A, 10th

Maccabi Ramat Gan (Hebrew: מכבי רמת גן) was an Israeli football club based in Ramat Gan. In 1959 it merged with Hakoah Tel Aviv to form Hakoah Maccabi Ramat Gan.

== History ==
In 1951–52 season the club was placed in the South Division Liga Bet (then the second division), where they finished second, missing out on promotion to champions Hapoel Kfar Saba.

At the end of the 1958–59 season, the club merged with Hakoah Tel Aviv to form a new club, Hakoah Maccabi Ramat Gan. The new club played at Maccabi's Gali Gil stadium in Ramat Gan, but largely consisted of Hakoah players. Maccabi Ramat Gan continued to play in Liga Bet (the third tier by then), up until the 1968–69 season, when another merger followed, this time with Liga Gimel club, Maccabi Ramat HaShikma. the merged club continued to play in Liga Bet as Maccabi HaShikma Ramat Gan.
