= Jerusalem International YMCA =

YMCA branch in Jerusalem

Coordinates: 31°46′27.03″N 35°13′16.83″E

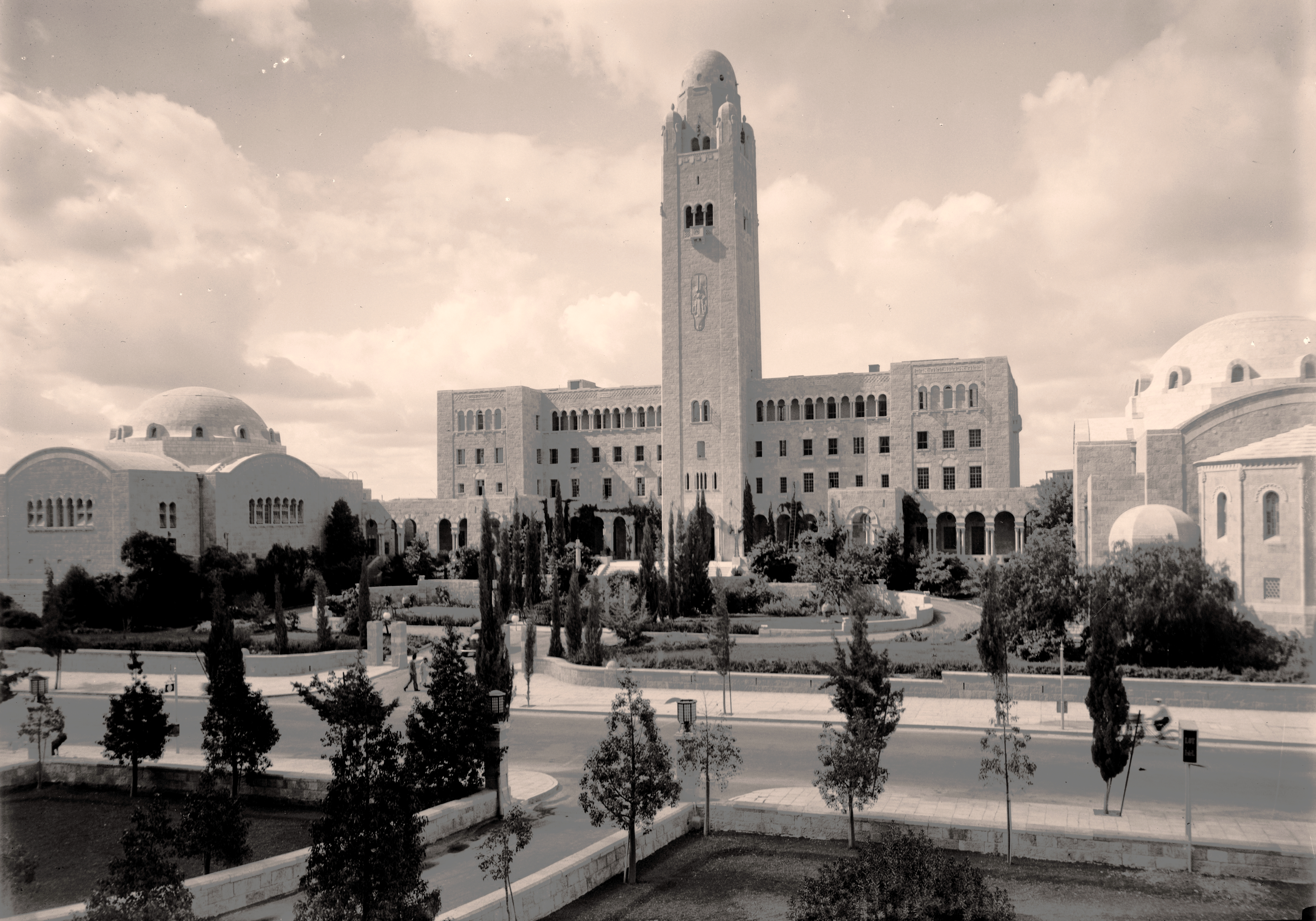
Y.M.C.A building in the 1930s

Jerusalem International YMCA is a YMCA branch in Jerusalem established in the early twentieth century.

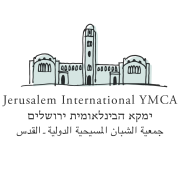
Official logo of the Jerusalem International YMCA

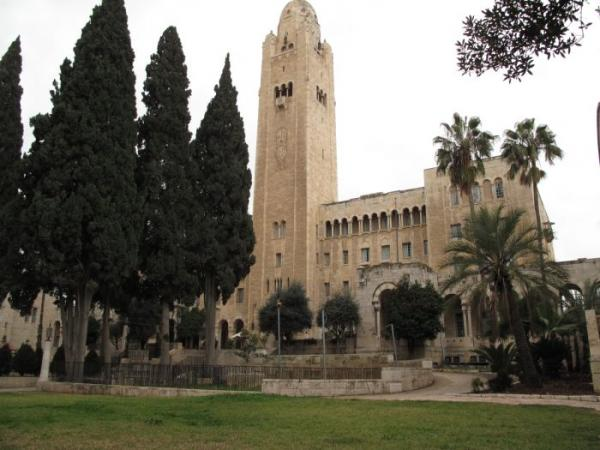
YMCA Jerusalem

== History ==
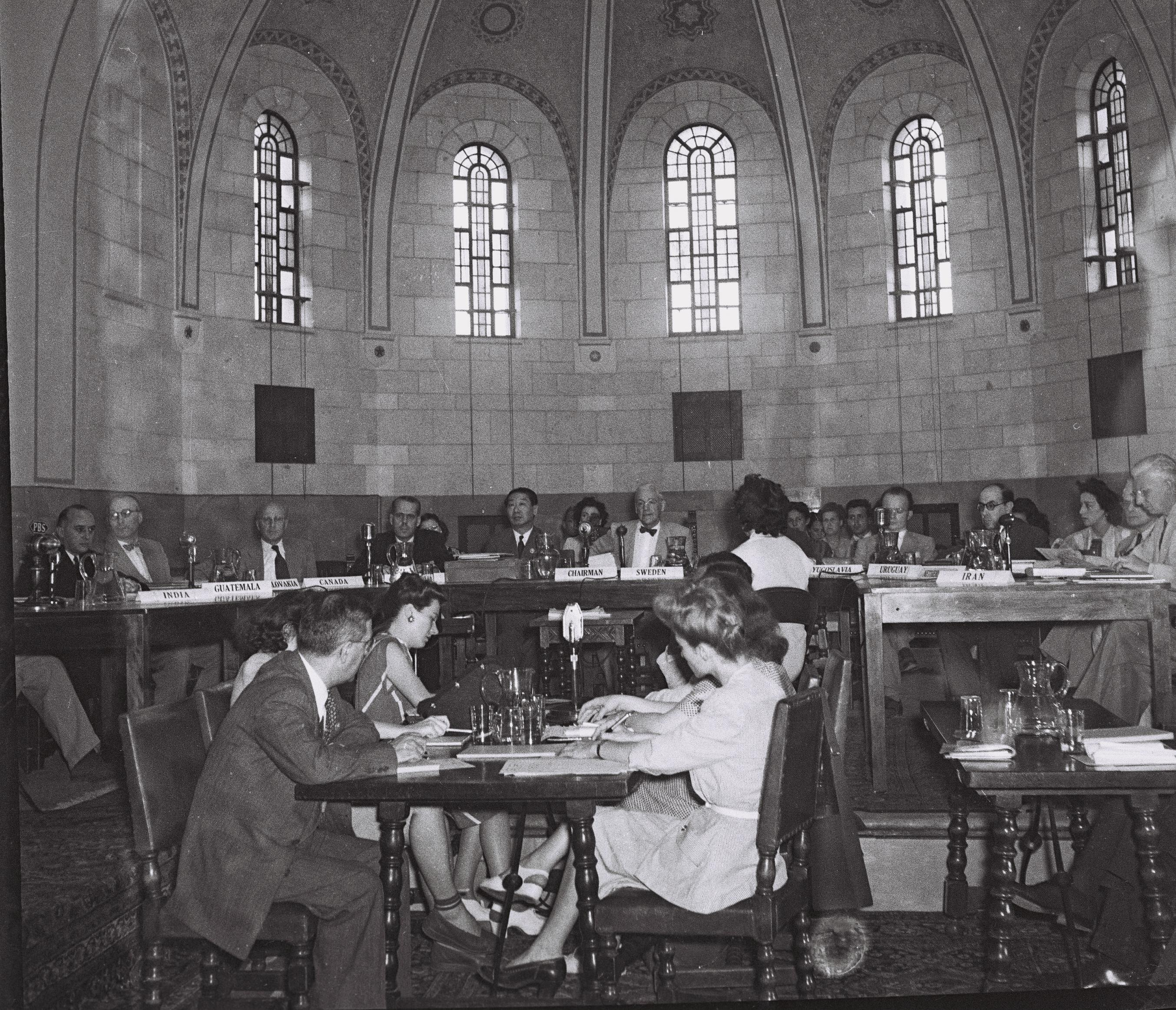
Many of the UNSCOP sessions to decide the fate of Palestine were held at the YMCA

In 1924, Archibald Clinton Harte, General Secretary of the International YMCA, raised the sum of one million dollars towards the construction of the building. Harte developed a vision for a permanent Y building and worked tirelessly planning every detail. For years, he cultivated donors who shared his vision of a “Sermon in Stone.”

After seven years of construction, the new Jerusalem YMCA was dedicated in 1933 with the words “Here is a place whose atmosphere is peace, where political and religious jealousies can be forgotten and international unity be fostered and developed.” Harte retired to his home on the shores of Galilee, which he bequeathed to the Jerusalem International YMCA as an international conference facility. The cornerstone was laid in 1928 by Lord Plumer, the British High Commissioner for Palestine, on a plot of land in the West Nikephoria section of Jerusalem, purchased from the Greek Orthodox Patriarchate of Jerusalem.

When the building opened on April 18, 1933, the event was attended by YMCA leaders from around the world. Details of the building, with its elegant arches, domes and tower, were described in the world press, which hailed it as a wellspring of cultural, athletic, social and intellectual life. Until 1991, the YMCA stadium was the only soccer stadium in Jerusalem.

The building was designed by the American architect Arthur Loomis Harmon of Shreve, Lamb and Harmon, who designed the Empire State Building. The Jerusalem YMCA housed the city's first heated swimming pool and first gymnasium with a wooden floor. The first concert broadcasts of the Palestine Broadcasting Service radio station were transmitted from the YMCA auditorium.

In 1947, the YMCA was the venue of the UNSCOP talks leading up to the UN Partition Plan. At the end of April 1948 the building was taken over by the International Red Cross, sheltering around 80 refugees. Two months later it was used by the UN Mediation Committee headed by Count Bernadotte and in September it was taken over by the US Consulate with US guards and naval telecommunications equipment. The building was restored to the YMCA in April 1949.

For two months after the 1967 war the UN had a temporary headquarters in the building.

In 2003, 62.5% of the membership were Jewish, 19.5% Muslim and 18% Christian.

== The stadium ==
YMCA Stadium אצטדיון ימק"א
- "The Sandbox"
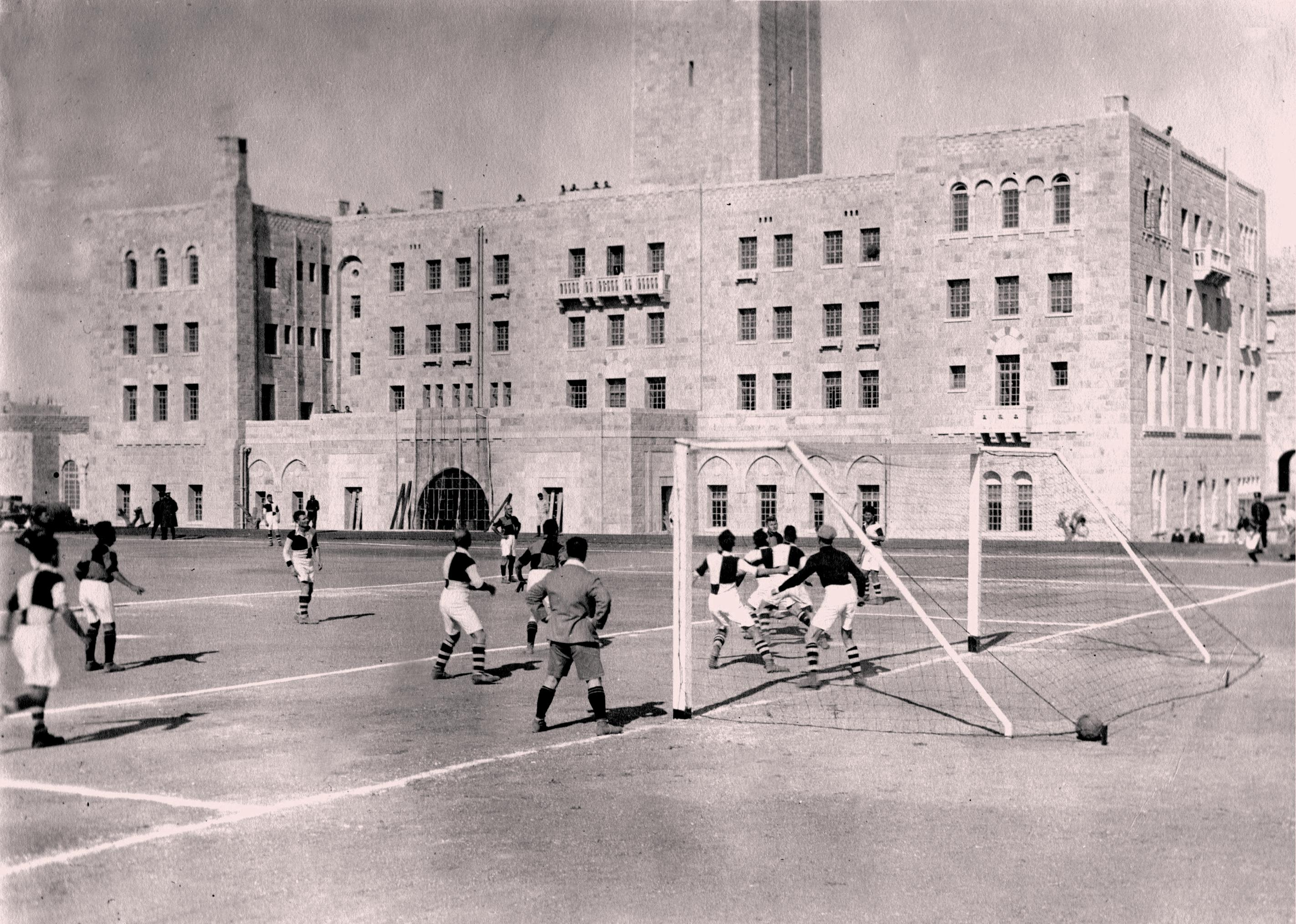
- Interactive map of YMCA Stadium אצטדיון ימק"א
- Location: Jerusalem
- Owner: YMCA
- Operator: YMCA
- Capacity: 6000
- Surface: Grass

Construction
- Groundbreaking: 1928
- Opened: 1933
- Demolished: 2006

Tenants
- Beitar Jerusalem (1960s-1991); Hapoel Jerusalem (1980s-1991)

YMCA Stadium (Hebrew: אצטדיון ימק"א, Itztadion Yimka) was the city's only sports stadium until 1991. It was the home of Beitar Jerusalem Football Club until the construction of Teddy Stadium in Malha in the 1990s. It was razed by developers to make way for a luxury housing project, King David's Court.

== Youth Chorus ==
The YMCA Jerusalem Youth Chorus is an interfaith (Christian, Muslim and Jewish) group of young singers. The Chorus encourages the youth from East and West Jerusalem to come together to become leaders for peace in their communities by providing a space where they can engage one another in musical and verbal dialogue.

The Youth Chorus and the Choir of St. Jean Baptiste performed a rendition of the Three Dog Night song "Joy to the World" on the 24 September 2015 episode of The Late Show with Stephen Colbert to celebrate Pope Francis's trip to the US.

== See also ==
- Baruch Katinka
