= List of Maccabi Petah Tikva F.C. seasons =

This is a list of seasons played by Maccabi Petah Tikva Football Club in Israeli and European football, from 1928 (when the club joined the newly founded EIFA) to the most recent completed season. It details the club's achievements in major competitions, and the top scorers for each season. Top scorers in bold were also the top scorers in the Israeli league that season. Records of minor competitions such as the Lilian Cup are not included due to their being considered of less importance than the State Cup and the Toto Cup.

The club has won the State Cup three times (1935, 1951-52, 2023–24) and the Toto Cup (for top division clubs) four times (1994-95, 1999–2000, 2003–04, 2015–16). The club has never been out of the two top divisions of Israeli football.

== History ==
Maccabi Petah Tikva Football Club was established in 1912 by a group of students from Petah Tikva in Istanbul. In 1928 the club joined the IFA and has competed in its competitions ever since. The club played in the top division until the end of the 1965–66 season, when the club relegated to the second division for the first time in its existence. Although the club has never won the top division, it finished as runners-up three times in its history (1951–52, 1953–54, 2003–04).

== Seasons ==
Season	League									State Cup	League Cup	Europe	Top goalscorer (Note: Goals in all competitions (Liga Leumit or Liga Al, State Cup, Toto Cup and European) are counted.)	
Season	Division	P	W	D	L	F	A	Pts	Pos	State Cup	League Cup	Europe	Name	Goals
1927–28	–	–	–	–	–	–	–	–	–	R1	–	–		
1928–29	–	–	–	–	–	–	–	–	–	R2	–	–		
1929–30	–	–	–	–	–	–	–	–	–	QF	–	–		
1930–31	Pal. League (Note: The 1930–31 league season was abandoned after several weeks due to tensions between the British Mandate government and the Jewish community following the publication of the Passfield white paper.)	5	3	1	1	18	12	7	3rd	–	–	–		
1931–32	Pal. League	16	4	1	11	30	45	9	6th	QF	–	–		
1932–33	–	–	–	–	–	–	–	–	–	SF	–	–		
1933–34	Pal. League	11	5	2	4	14	16	12	5th	R1	–	–		
1934–35	Pal. League (Note: The 1934–35 league season was stopped to allow Maccabi club to prepare for the 1935 Maccabiah Games and wasn't renewed due to disagreement between Maccabi and Hapoel)	9	3	1	5	18	19	7	4th	Winners	–	–		
1935–36	Pal. League (Note: The 1935–36 league season was held from7 December 1935 to 18 December 1936.)	10	2	3	5	10	20	7	5th	– (Note: After three matches played in the first round the competition was abandoned due to the Arab Revolt.)	–	–		
1936–37	Pal. League	10	2	3	5	10	20	7	5th	QF	–	–		
1937–38	Pal. League	8	1	1	6	9	24	3	5th	QF	–	–		
1938–39	Pal. League (Note: The 1938–39 league season was abandoned after playing one round of matches due to the Arab Revolt.)	11	2	2	7	13	20	6	7th	Final	–	–		
1939–40	Pal. League	14	5	0	9	32	42	10	7th	R2	–	–		
1940–41	–	–	–	–	–	–	–	–	–	R2	–	–		
1941–42	Pal. League; Southern (Note: The 1941–42 league season was held in three regional divisions followed by a play-off. The league season was lasted until fall 1943.)	26	15	2	6	54	38	32	5th	R2	–	–		
1942–43	Pal. League; Southern	26	15	2	6	54	38	32	5th	–	–	–		
1943–44	Pal. League	23	5	2	16	32	73	12	13th	SF (Note: The 1944 cup competitions began on 5 February 1944 and was completed during the following season, on 13 January 1945.)	–	–		
1944–45	Pal. League; Northern	12	3	1	8	9	32	7	6th	SF	–	–		
1945–46	–	–	–	–	–	–	–	–	–	R2	–	–		
1946–47	Pal. League	26	17	3	6	84	45	37	3rd	SF	–	–		
1947–48	Pal. League (Note: The 1947–48 league was abandoned due to the 1948 Arab–Israeli War.)	7	3	1	3	16	16	7	6th	–	–	–		
1948–49	Isr. League (Note: The 1949–50 league began in May 1949 and ended on 24 June 1950.)	24	13	5	6	84	47	31	5th	QF (Note: The 1949 cup competition was delayed by appeals after the completion of the quarter-finals. After settling the appeals three further matches were played in February 1951, after which the competition was abandoned.)	–	–		
1949–50	Isr. League	24	13	5	6	84	47	31	5th	QF	–	–		
1950–51	–	–	–	–	–	–	–	–	–	QF	–	–		
1951–52	Alef	22	12	6	4	65	23	30	2nd	Winners	–	–		
1952–53	–	–	–	–	–	–	–	–	–	Round of 16	–	–		
1953–54	Alef	22	13	6	3	50	22	32	2nd	Round of 16	–	–		
1954–55	Alef	26	10	7	9	37	41	27	7th	QF	–	–	Eliezer Spiegel; Amnon Carmeli	6
1955–56	Leumit	22	10	7	5	47	34	27	4th	–	–	–	Eliezer Spiegel	17
1956–57	Leumit	18	8	5	5	27	26	21	4th	Round of 16	–	–		
1957–58	Leumit	22	7	3	12	30	37	17	11th	Round of 16	–	–		
1958–59	Leumit	22	10	3	9	27	30	23	6th	SF	SF	–		
1959–60	Leumit	22	6	5	11	25	38	17	9th	R7	–	–		
1960–61	Leumit	22	6	4	12	23	31	16	9th	R7	–	–		
1961–62	Leumit	22	5	6	11	14	30	16	11th	Round of 16	–	–		
1962–63	Leumit	22	7	5	10	22	31	19	10th	QF	–	–		
1963–64	Leumit	28	12	4	12	46	39	28	7th	Round of 16	–	–		
1964–65	Leumit	30	10	9	11	39	42	29	10th	SF	–	–		
1965–66	Leumit	30	7	9	14	26	43	23	15th	Round of 16	–	–		
1966–67	Alef North	60	38	11	11	125	59	87	2nd	Round of 16	–	–		
1967–68	Alef North	60	38	11	11	125	59	87	2nd	SF	–	–		
1968–69	Alef (North)	30	22	7	1	63	13	51	1st	Round of 16	–	–		
1969–70	Leumit	30	7	14	9	32	37	28	12th	QF	–	–		
1970–71	Leumit	30	8	9	13	30	39	25	15th	Round of 16	–	–		
1971–72	Alef North	30	22	6	2	76	19	50	1st	QF	–	–		
1972–73	Leumit	30	9	12	9	39	41	30	9th	SF	Winners	–		
1973–74	Leumit	30	6	16	8	21	31	28	12th	QF	–	–		
1974–75	Leumit	30	2	9	19	12	45	13	16th	R4	–	–		
1975–76	Leumit	34	12	11	11	37	36	35	8th	R4	–	–		
1976–77	Leumit	30	5	7	18	20	51	17	16th	Round of 16	–	–		
1977–78	Artzit	26	16	4	6	35	24	36	2nd	QF	–	–		
1978–79	Leumit	30	8	11	11	25	46	27	13th	QF	–	–		
1979–80	Leumit	30	11	8	11	32	34	30	8th	QF	–	–		
1980–81	Leumit	30	12	9	9	49	39	33	4th	R7	–	–		
1981–82	Leumit	30	9	11	10	35	35	29	9th	QF	–	–		
1982–83	Leumit	30	8	12	10	25	30	36	9th	R7	–	–		
1983–84	Leumit	30	8	13	9	26	26	37	9th	QF	–	–		
1984–85	Leumit	30	13	9	8	45	31	48	4th	SF	Group	–		
1985–86	Leumit	30	11	7	12	34	41	40	7th	QF	Group	–		
1986–87	Leumit	30	11	12	7	29	21	45	6th	Round of 16	Group	–		
1987–88	Leumit	31	3	8	20	19	49	17	14th	Round of 16	Group	–		
1988–89	Artzit	31	14	11	6	40	22	53	3rd	R7	Group	–		
1989–90	Artzit	30	12	11	7	31	21	47	6th	R8	Winners	–		
1990–91	Artzit	30	19	7	4	73	27	64	1st	QF	Winners	–		
1991–92	Leumit	30	15	6	11	46	41	51	7th	QF	Group	–		
1992–93	Leumit	33	9	11	13	43	55	38	10th	Round of 16	SF	–		
1993–94	Leumit	39	11	14	14	37	46	47	8th	SF	Group	–		
1994–95	Leumit	30	7	14	9	40	41	35	8th	Round of 16	Winners	–		
1995–96	Leumit	30	13	10	7	43	37	49	6th	QF	Group	–		
1996–97	Leumit	30	14	10	6	39	22	52	4th	Round of 16	Group	–		
1997–98	Leumit	30	8	12	10	27	31	36	9th	Round of 16	Group	Intertoto, Group		
1998–99	Leumit	30	10	7	13	45	45	37	10th	Round of 16	Group	–		
1999–2000	Premier	39	18	6	15	50	47	60	4th	QF	Winners	–		
2000–01	Premier	38	13	8	17	43	52	47	8th	Final	QF	–		
2001–02	Premier	33	8	12	13	36	47	36	8th	QF	R2	–		
2002–03	Premier	33	13	11	9	45	37	50	6th	Round of 16	QF	–		
2003–04	Premier	33	16	8	9	49	35	56	3rd	R8	Winners	–		
2004–05	Premier	33	16	12	5	47	24	60	2nd	SF	Group	UEFA Cup, R1		
2005–06	Premier	33	12	8	13	37	38	44	5th	QF	Group	UEFA Cup, Group		
2006–07	Premier	33	14	8	11	31	27	50	6th	QF	Group	Intertoto, R3	Omer Golan	10
2007–08	Premier	33	10	7	16	28	39	37	10th	R9	QF	–	Ohad Kadousi	6
2008–09	Premier	33	11	11	11	36	35	44	7th	R9	Group	–	Lior Asulin; Pablo Bastianini	7
2009–10	Premier	33	10	11	12	44	47	24 (Note: Maccabi Petah Tikva achieved 35 points in the regular season, which were halved at the beginning of the play-offs. The club scored 6 more points during the play-offs for a total of 41 points.)	8th	QF	Group	–	Omer Damari	11
2010–11	Premier	33	13	10	10	57	41	28 (Note: Maccabi Petah Tikva achieved 42 points in the regular season, which were halved at the beginning of the play-offs. The club scored 7 more points during the play-offs for a total of 49 points.)	7th	R8	Final	–	Tal Ben Haim	8
2011–12	Premier	37	11	10	16	39	57	40 (Note: the club was deducted three points due to its staff participation in a post-match melee in a match against Hapoel Haifa.)	14th	QF	SF	–	Tal Ben Haim; Victor Merey	12
2012–13	Leumit	37	21	10	6	66	29	73	1st	R7	SF	–	Omer Golan	18
2013–14	Premier	33	8	9	16	39	57	33	12th	SF	–	–	Roei Dayan; Lidor Cohen	9
2014–15	Premier	36	12	12	12	34	41	48	6th	QF	QF	–	Idan Shemesh	6
2015–16	Premier	33	13	7	13	34	35	46	7th	Round of 16	Winners	–	Guy Melamed	8

== Key ==
- P = Played
- W = Games won
- D = Games drawn
- L = Games lost
- F = Goals for
- A = Goals against
- Pts = Points
- Pos = Final position
- Leumit = Liga Leumit (National League)
- Artzit = Liga Artzit (Nationwide League)
- Premier = Liga Al (Premier League)
- Pal. League = Palestine League
- F = Final
- Group = Group stage
- QF = Quarter-finals
- QR1 = First Qualifying Round
- QR2 = Second Qualifying Round
- QR3 = Third Qualifying Round
- QR4 = Fourth Qualifying Round
- RInt = Intermediate Round
- R1 = Round 1
- R2 = Round 2
- R3 = Round 3
- R4 = Round 4
- R5 = Round 5
- R6 = Round 6
- SF = Semi-finals

Champions	Runners-up	Promoted	Relegated
