= 1955–56 Hapoel Kfar Saba F.C. season =

Hapoel Kfar Saba
1955–56 season
- Manager: Emmanuel Scheffer; Moshe Poliakov
- Stadium: Hapoel Ground
- Liga Alef (1955) Liga Leumit (1956): 12th 12th
- Top goalscorer: Haim Glazer (10)

The 1955–56 Hapoel Kfar Saba season was the club's 29th season since its establishment in 1928, and 8th since the establishment of the State of Israel.

At the start of the season, the league which started during the previous season was completed, with the club finishing 12th (out of 14), which meant the club had to compete in a promotion/relegation play-offs against the 11th placed club, Beitar Jerusalem, and the two Liga Bet winners, Maccabi Jaffa and Hapoel Kiryat Haim. Haopel Kfar Saba placed 2nd in the play-offs, preserving their top division status.

The new league season, with the top division being renamed Liga Leumit, began on 3 December 1955 and was completed on 3 June 1956, with the club finishing in 12th and bottom position, relegating to Liga Alef.

== Match Results ==
=== Legend ===
Win Draw Loss

=== 1954–55 Liga Alef ===
The league began on 6 February 1955, and by the time the previous season ended, only 20 rounds of matches were completed, with the final 6 rounds being played during September and October 1955.

==== Final table ====
Pos	Club	P	W	D	L	GF	GA	Gr	Pts	Notes
10	Hapoel Ramat Gan	26	10	3	13	35	41	0.85	23	
11	Beitar Jerusalem	26	8	5	13	37	59	0.63	21	Promotion/relegation play-offs
12	Hapoel Kfar Saba	26	6	6	14	38	46	0.83	18	Promotion/relegation play-offs
13	Hapoel Hadera	26	7	2	17	36	53	0.68	16	Relegated to Liga Alef
14	Hapoel Balfouria	26	3	2	21	32	129	0.25	8	Relegated to Liga Alef

==== Matches ====
3 September 1955 21	Maccabi Petah Tikva	5–4	Hapoel Kfar Saba	Petah Tikva
	Tukenitz 13'; I. Ben-Dror 15'; Spiegel 47', 59'; Carmeli 56'	Report (p. 8)	2' Tzahobel; 7' H. Glazer; 69' (pen.), 71' (pen.) Bulman	Stadium: Hapoel Ground; Attendance: 1,000; Referee: Frizner

10 September 1955 22	Hapoel Kfar Saba	0–1	Beitar Jerusalem	Kfar Saba
		Report (p. 8)	44' Elfasi	Stadium: Hapoel Ground; Attendance: 2,500; Referee: Frizner

24 September 1955 23	Hapoel Ramat Gan	4–3	Hapoel Kfar Saba	Givatayim
	Chronsich 3', 47'; R. Cohen 23'; Fritzner 74'	Report (p. 8)	43' H. Glazer; 50' Tobiash; 51' Bulman	Stadium: HaMakhtesh Stadium; Attendance: 3,000; Referee: Moshe Cohen

1 October 1955 24	Hapoel Kfar Saba	0–1	Maccabi Netanya	Kfar Saba
		Report (p. 8)	66' M. Cohen	Stadium: Hapoel Ground; Attendance: 2,500; Referee: Rosenbaum

8 October 1955 25	Maccabi Tel Aviv	2–1	Hapoel Kfar Saba	Tel Aviv
	Reznik 72'; Studinski 89'	Report (p. 8)	58' (pen.) Bulman	Stadium: Basa Stadium; Attendance: 5,000; Referee: Dudkevich

15 October 1955 26	Hapoel Kfar Saba	1–3	Beitar Tel Aviv	Kfar Saba
	Ratz 65'	Report (p. 8)	1' Elmaliah; 2', 12' Gleit	Stadium: Hapoel Ground; Attendance: 2,500; Referee: Sher

==== Results by match ====
Round	1	2	3	4	5	6	7	8	9	10	11	12	13	14	15	16	17	18	19	20	21	22	23	24	25	26
Result	W	D	W	D	L	D	W	L	L	W	W	D	D	L	L	L	W	L	L	D	L	L	L	L	L	L
Position	4	5	3	5	5	4	4	6	6	6	6	6	6	6	6	7	6	8	8	8	8	8	12	12	12	12

Updated to match(es) played on 15 October 1955. Source: 2 Dear Points
W = Win; D = Draw; L = Loss

=== Promotion/relegation play-offs ===
==== Table ====
Pos	Club	P	W	D	L	GF	GA	GR	Pts	Notes
1	Maccabi Jaffa	3	2	1	0	8	2	4.00	5	Liga Leumit
2	Hapoel Kfar Saba	3	1	2	0	5	3	1.67	4	Liga Leumit
3	Hapoel Kiryat Haim	3	1	1	1	5	7	0.71	3	Liga Alef
4	Beitar Jerusalem	3	0	0	3	3	9	0.33	0	Liga Alef

Beitar Jerusalem relegated to Liga Alef

==== Matches ====
22 October 1955 1	Hapoel Kfar Saba	3–1	Beitar Jerusalem	Netanya
	Avrutski 5'; Ratz 26'; Glazer 33'	Report (p. 8)	7' Elfasi	Stadium: Sar-Tov Stadium; Attendance: 4,000; Referee: Reuven Frizner

29 October 1955 2	Hapoel Kfar Saba	1–1	Maccabi Jaffa	Haifa
	Glazer 58'	Report (p. 8)	59' B. Cohen	Stadium: Kiryat Eliezer Stadium; Attendance: 5,000; Referee: Sher

5 November 1955 3	Hapoel Kfar Saba	1–1	Hapoel Kiryat Haim	Netanya
	Morovich 78'	Report (p. 8)	47' Hayat	Stadium: Sar-Tov Stadium; Attendance: 2,500; Referee: Fritzner

=== 1955–56 Liga Leumit ===
==== Final table ====
Pos	Club	P	W	D	L	GF	GA	GR	Pts	Notes
8	Maccabi Netanya	22	9	2	11	31	44	0.70	20	
9	Hapoel Ramat Gan	22	9	0	13	28	42	0.67	18	
10	Maccabi Jaffa	22	6	5	11	39	48	0.81	17	Promotion/relegation play-offs
11	Maccabi Rehovot	22	6	1	15	25	64	0.39	13	Relegated to Liga Alef
12	Hapoel Kfar Saba	22	3	6	13	20	48	0.42	12	Relegated to Liga Alef

==== Matches ====
3 December 1955 1	Maccabi Netanya	3–3	Hapoel Kfar Saba	Netanya
	H. Meller 35'; I. Caspi 36'; 63' Statzki		3' Ratz; 20' Tenenbaum; 26' Tobiash	Stadium: Sar-Tov Stadium; Attendance: 2,500; Referee: Rosenbaum

10 December 1955 2	Hapoel Kfar Saba	1–4	Maccabi Haifa	Kfar Saba
	Bulman 60'		6', 62' Menchel; 25', 84' S. Levi	Stadium: Hapoel Ground; Attendance: 1,400; Referee: Moshe Cohen

17 December 1955 3	Hapoel Kfar Saba	1–5	Hapoel Tel Aviv	Kfar Saba
	Tzahobel 31'		14' Tish; 52', 66', 80' Weiss; 57' Rosenbaum	Stadium: Hapoel Ground; Attendance: 1,500; Referee: Ben-Rubi

24 December 1955 4	Maccabi Petah Tikva	7–1	Hapoel Kfar Saba	Petah Tikva
	Spiegel 34', 59'; I. Ben-Dror 37', 51'; Levkovich 23'; Bernard 56'; Carmeli 61'		74' (pen.) Bulman	Stadium: Maccabi Ground; Attendance: 2,000; Referee: Markovich

31 December 1955 5	Hapoel Kfar Saba	0–0	Maccabi Rehovot	Kfar Saba
				Stadium: Hapoel Ground; Referee: Ben-Rubi

7 January 1956 6	Hapoel Haifa	3–0	Hapoel Kfar Saba	Haifa
	Ginzburg 40'; Martin 79' (pen.); Nestenfober 89'			Stadium: Kiryat Eliezer Stadium; Attendance: 3,500; Referee: Moshe Cohen

14 January 1956 7	Hapoel Kfar Saba	2–1	Hapoel Petah Tikva	Kfar Saba
	Bonin 11'; Tobiash 47'		65' Nahari	Stadium: Hapoel Ground; Attendance: 1,500; Referee: Dudkevich

21 January 1956 8	Maccabi Tel Aviv	0–0	Hapoel Kfar Saba	Tel Aviv
				Stadium: Basa Stadium; Attendance: 4,000; Referee: Fritzner

11 February 1956 9	Beitar Tel Aviv	3–2	Hapoel Kfar Saba	Tel Aviv
	Bar-Zion 20'; Huli 33'; Strugo 34'		28' Lutotovski; 63' H. Glazer	Stadium: Maccabi Jaffa Ground; Attendance: 4,000; Referee: Schwartz

18 February 1956 10	Hapoel Kfar Saba	1–2	Hapoel Ramat Gan	Kfar Saba
	H. Glazer 74' (pen.)		63' (pen.) I. Kirschenberg; 65' Kofetz	Stadium: Hapoel Ground; Referee: Ben-Rubi

26 February 1956 11	Maccabi Jaffa	4–1	Hapoel Kfar Saba	Tel Aviv
	Gal 49'; Herschkovitz 53'; B. Cohen 83', 88'		27' H. Glazer	Stadium: Maccabi Jaffa Ground; Referee: M. Cohen

3 March 1956 12	Hapoel Kfar Saba	0–2	Maccabi Netanya	Kfar Saba
			30' M. Cohen; 32' I. Caspi	Stadium: Hapoel Ground; Attendance: 1,200; Referee: Fried

10 March 1956 13	Maccabi Haifa	1–2	Hapoel Kfar Saba	Haifa
	Abramovich 31'		57' Tzahobel; 80' H. Glazer	Stadium: Kiryat Eliezer Stadium; Attendance: 4,000; Referee: Wackermann

17 March 1956 14	Hapoel Tel Aviv	0–0	Hapoel Kfar Saba	Tel Aviv
				Stadium: Basa Stadium; Referee: Fried

24 March 1956 15	Hapoel Kfar Saba	1–1	Maccabi Petah Tikva	Kfar Saba
	Glazer 38'		22' Scharf	Stadium: Hapoel Ground; Referee: Frizner

31 March 1956 16	Maccabi Rehovot	3–2	Hapoel Kfar Saba	Rehovot
	Vider 71', 75' (pen.), 90'		25' Tobiash; 52' (pen.) Bulman	Stadium: Maccabi Ground; Referee: Zahavi

7 April 1956 17	Hapoel Kfar Saba	0–1	Hapoel Haifa	Kfar Saba
			87' Ginzburg	Stadium: Hapoel Ground; Referee: Fritzner

14 April 1956 18	Hapoel Petah Tikva	4–0	Hapoel Kfar Saba	Petah Tikva
	Rabayov 3'; Zelikovich 18'; Kofman 77'; Ratzabi 88'			Stadium: Hapoel Ground; Referee: Moshe Cohen

22 April 1956 19	Hapoel Kfar Saba	0–1	Maccabi Tel Aviv	Kfar Saba
			48' Reznik	Stadium: Hapoel Ground; Referee: Ben-Rubi

19 May 1956 20	Hapoel Kfar Saba	2–0	Beitar Tel Aviv	Kfar Saba
	H. Glazer 64' (pen.); Tobiash 69'			Stadium: Hapoel Ground; Attendance: 2,000; Referee: Frizner

27 May 1956 21	Hapoel Ramat Gan	3–1	Hapoel Kfar Saba	Givatayim
	Tsalala 10'; Chronsich 15'; Kirschenberg 25' (pen.)		50' Tzahobel	Stadium: HaMakhtesh Stadium; Referee: Klein

2 June 1956 22	Hapoel Kfar Saba	0–0	Maccabi Jaffa	Kfar Saba
				Stadium: Hapoel Ground; Referee: Sher

==== Results by match ====
Round	1	2	3	4	5	6	7	8	9	10	11	12	13	14	15	16	17	18	19	20	21	22
Result	D	L	L	L	D	L	W	D	L	L	L	L	W	D	D	L	L	L	L	W	L	L
Position	5	10	11	11	10	12	12	11	11	12	12	12	12	12	12	12	12	12	12	12	12	12

Updated to match(es) played on 28 July 1956. Source: IFA
W = Win; D = Draw; L = Loss
