= List of Beitar Tel Aviv F.C. seasons =

This is a list of seasons played by Beitar Tel Aviv Football Club in Israeli and European football, from 1937 (when the club was established) to the most recent completed season, including seasons in which the club was merged with Shimshon Tel Aviv (between 2001 and 2011, playing as Beitar Shimshon Tel Aviv) and with Ironi Ramla (starting from 2011, playing as Beitar Tel Aviv Ramla). It details the club's achievements in major competitions, and the top scorers for each season. Top scorers in bold were also the top scorers in the Israeli league that season. Records of minor competitions such as the Lilian Cup are not included due to them being considered of less importance than the State Cup and the Toto Cup.

== History ==
Beitar Tel Aviv was established in 1934 as part of the Revisionist Zionist youth movement and joined Liga Bet in Liga Bet. Ahead of the 1940 season the club was promoted to the top division, finishing second in its debut season in the league and winning the Palestine Cup. The club won another cup in 1942 and won a joint championship in 1944–45. In summer 1947 the Beitar movement was outlawed by the Mandate High Commissioner, forcing the club to change its name to Nordia Tel Aviv, under which the club played until the establishment if Israel. After the establishment of Israel the club struggled, dropping to the second division in 1961 for the first time. In 2000 the club merged with Shimshon Tel Aviv to form Beitar Shimshon Tel Aviv. In 2011 the club merged with Ironi Ramla, while Shimshon Tel Aviv left the merged club. The newly-merged club took the name Beitar Tel Aviv Ramla, moving to play in Ramla.

== Seasons ==
=== As Beitar Tel Aviv ===
Season	League									State Cup	League Cup	International (Asia/Europe)	Top goalscorer (Note: Goals in all competitions (Liga Leumit or Liga Al, State Cup, Toto Cup and European) are counted.)	
Season	Division	P	W	D	L	F	A	Pts	Pos	State Cup	League Cup	International (Asia/Europe)	Name	Goals
1937–38	Bet	8	4	2	2	18	12	10	2nd	–	–	–		
1938–39	–	–	–	–	–	–	–	–	–	R1	–	–		
1939–40	Pal. League	14	8	3	3	43	8	19	2nd	Winners	–	–		
1940–41	–	–	–	–	–	–	–	–	–	QF	–	–		
1941–42	Pal. League; Southern (Note: The 1941–42 league season was held in three regional divisions followed by a play-off. The league was completed during the 1942–43 season.)	26	11	4	11	50	48	25 (Note: A match between Beitar Tel Aviv and Hapoel Rishon LeZion was given as a 0–0 with no points awarded due to infringements from both clubs.)	7th	Winners	–	–		
1942–43	–	–	–	–	–	–	–	–	–	SF	–	–		
1943–44	Pal. League	11	11	0	0	48	10	22	8th (Note: Beitar Tel Aviv was suspended from all IFA activity for the first half of the season after hosting NSC Cairo on 28 August 1943 against Egyptian Football Association and Eretz Israel Football Association orders to both clubs.)	– (Note: The 1944 cup competitions began on 5 February 1944 and was completed during the following season, on 13 January 1945.) (Note: Beitar teams withdrew from the competition in protest over the EIFA treatment of Beitar Tel Aviv after the team's match against NSC Cairo in the previous summer.)	–	–		
1944–45	Pal. League; Southern	10	9	1	0	33	9	19	1st	–	–	–		
1945–46	–	–	–	–	–	–	–	–	–	R1	–	–		
1946–47	Pal. League	26	20	3	3	90	32	43	2nd	Final	–	–		
1947–48	Pal. League (Note: The 1947–48 league was abandoned due to the 1948 Arab–Israeli War.)	6	5	1	0	16	8	11	1st	–	–	–		
1948–49	–	–	–	–	–	–	–	–	–	SF (Note: The 1949 cup competition was delayed by appeals after the completion of the quarter-finals. After settling the appeals three further matches were played in February 1951, and the competition was abandoned, at which point Beitar Tel Aviv had a second leg semi-final match against Hapoel Tel Aviv left to play.)	–	–		
1949–50	Isr. League	24	12	3	9	57	41	26 (Note: A match between Beitar Tel Aviv and Hapoel Petah Tikva was given as a 0–0 with no points awarded due to infringements from both clubs.)	6th	SF	–	–		
1950–51	–	–	–	–	–	–	–	–	–	SF	–	–		
1951–52	Alef	22	7	7	8	39	41	21	7th	R3	–	–		
1952–53	–	–	–	–	–	–	–	–	–	R4	–	–		
1953–54	Alef	22	7	3	12	23	42	17	11th	R4	–	–		
1954–55	Alef	26	12	5	9	64	47	29	5th	QF	–	–		
1955–56	Leumit	22	10	0	12	42	44	20	7th	–	–	–		
1956–57	Leumit	18	6	3	9	29	40	15	6th	Round of 16	–	–		
1957–58	Leumit	22	8	3	11	30	51	19	9th	R6	–	–		
1958–59	Leumit	22	2	9	11	20	47	13	11th	R6	QF	–		
1959–60	Leumit	22	6	5	11	14	26	17	10th	QF	–	–		
1960–61	Leumit	22	5	1	16	17	50	11	12th	QF	–	–		
1961–62	Alef	26	11	5	10	44	40	27	4th	Round of 16	–	–		
1962–63	Alef	30	10	6	14	36	47	26	11th	Round of 16	–	–		
1963–64	Alef South	26	18	3	5	64	15	39	1st	QF	–	–		
1964–65	Leumit	30	10	7	13	33	39	27	14th	R5	–	–		
1965–66	Leumit	30	5	10	15	21	37	20	16th	R6	–	–		
1966–67	Alef South	60	23	16	21	64	67	62	4th	R6	–	–		
1967–68	Alef South	60	23	16	21	64	67	62	4th	R3	–	–		
1968–69	Alef South	30	22	5	3	64	21	49	1st	R6	–	–		
1969–70	Leumit	30	8	13	9	28	34	29	9th	R6	–	–		
1970–71	Leumit	30	13	7	10	26	24	33	5th	Round of 16	–	–		
1971–72	Leumit	30	9	8	13	21	31	26	10th	Round of 16	–	–		
1972–73	Leumit	30	8	14	8	24	25	30	8th	R6	Group	–		
1973–74	Leumit	30	11	10	9	31	31	32	5th	Round of 16	–	–		
1974–75	Leumit	30	9	10	11	33	36	28	12th	R4	–	–		
1975–76	Leumit	34	12	11	11	28	33	35	12th	Round of 16	–	–		
1976–77	Leumit	30	13	7	10	32	26	33	4th	Final	–	–		
1977–78	Leumit	26	7	12	7	23	26	26	8th	Round of 16	–	–		
1978–79	Leumit	30	8	11	11	30	30	27	11th	SF	–	–		
1979–80	Leumit	30	7	12	11	27	39	26	15th	R7	–	–		
1980–81	Artzit	30	20	7	3	61	25	47	1st	Round of 16	–	–		
1981–82	Leumit	30	5	14	11	22	32	24	15th	Round of 16	–	–		
1982–83	Artzit	30	16	9	5	35	23	57	1st	R7	–	–		
1983–84	Leumit	30	11	7	12	41	40	40	6th	Round of 16	–	–		
1984–85	Leumit	30	7	10	13	28	43	31	14th	QF	Group	–		
1985–86	Artzit	30	16	7	7	54	27	55	2nd	R7	Group	–		
1986–87	Leumit	30	7	13	10	33	39	34	13th	SF	Group	–		
1987–88	Leumit	33	9	13	11	38	40	40	7th	QF	Group	–		
1988–89	Leumit	31	13	9	9	34	27	48	4th	SF	Group	–		
1989–90	Leumit	32	10	8	14	35	46	38	5th	R8	Group	–		
1990–91	Leumit	32	14	8	10	47	40	50	3rd	QF	Final	–		
1991–92	Leumit	32	11	6	15	43	47	39	5th	SF	Group	–		
1992–93	Leumit	33	6	7	20	28	68	25	12th	QF	Group	–		
1993–94	Artzit	30	14	8	8	37	32	50	3rd	R8	Winners	–		
1994–95	Leumit	30	10	4	16	43	60	34	11th	R8	Group	–		
1995–96	Leumit	30	6	6	18	30	63	24	15th	QF	Group	–		
1996–97	Artzit	30	9	10	11	27	37	37	9th	R8	Group	–		
1997–98	Leumit	30	11	7	12	33	36	40	6th	R8	Group	–		
1998–99	Artzit	30	10	3	17	28	46	33	11th	R7	Group	–		
1999–2000	Artzit	33	21	2	10	52	27	65	2nd	QF	– (Note: Beitar Tel Aviv were not allowed to compete as their budget wasn't approved prior to the tournament's beginning.)	–		

=== As Beitar Shimshon Tel Aviv ===
Season	League									State Cup	League Cup	International (Asia/Europe)	Top goalscorer	
Season	Division	P	W	D	L	F	A	Pts	Pos	State Cup	League Cup	International (Asia/Europe)	Name	Goals
2000–01	Artzit	33	13	10	10	43	34	49	4th	Round of 16	Group	–		
2001–02	Artzit	33	17	8	8	49	29	59	3rd	RInt	SF	–		
2002–03	Artzit	33	10	9	14	42	46	39	8th	R7	Group	–		
2003–04	Artzit	33	9	9	15	37	49	36	10th	R7	Group	–		
2004–05	Artzit	33	8	14	11	40	40	38	6th	R7	Group	–		
2005–06	Artzit	33	11	9	13	43	50	42	6th	R8	Group	–		
2006–07	Artzit	33	10	14	9	31	28	44	6th	R9	Group	–	Murad Alyan	15
2007–08	Artzit	33	12	7	14	36	35	43	9th	SF	Final	–	Murad Alyan	13
2008–09	Artzit	33	15	8	10	44	34	53	6th	R8	Group	–	Shlomi Toledo	11
2009–10	Leumit	35	10	13	12	31	47	27 (Note: Beitar Shimshon Tel Aviv scored 33 points in the regular season, which were halved at the beginning of the play-offs. The club scored 10 more points during the play-offs for a total of 43 points.)	12th	R7	Group	–	Ido Exbard	13
2010–11	Leumit	33	9	9	15	44	47	19 (Note: Beitar Shimshon Tel Aviv scored 34 points in the regular season, which were halved at the beginning of the play-offs. The club scored 2 more points during the play-offs for a total of 36 points.)	10th	R7	Group	–	Sharon Gormezano	14

=== As Beitar Tel Aviv Ramla ===
Season	League									State Cup	League Cup	International (Asia/Europe)	Top goalscorer	
Season	Division	P	W	D	L	F	A	Pts	Pos	State Cup	League Cup	International (Asia/Europe)	Name	Goals
2011–12	Leumit	33	12	10	11	48	43	25 (Note: Beitar Tel Aviv Ramla scored 42 points in the regular season, which were halved at the beginning of the play-offs. The club scored 4 more points during the play-offs for a total of 46 points.)	8th	R8	Group	–	Itzhak Abushdid	14
2012–13	Leumit	37	9	13	15	45	58	40	14th	R8	Group	–	Dan Roman	10
2013–14	Leumit	37	10	15	12	39	45	45	7th	R8	–	–	Itzhak Abushdid; Gil Gilkarov	7
2014–15	Leumit	37	12	11	14	44	53	47	12th	R8	QF	–	Uri Magbo	9
2015–16	Leumit	37	19	4	14	60	50	61	9th	QF	Group	–	Rotem Shimol	17

== Key ==
- P = Played
- W = Games won
- D = Games drawn
- L = Games lost
- F = Goals for
- A = Goals against
- Pts = Points
- Pos = Final position
- Leumit = Liga Leumit (National League)
- Artzit = Liga Artzit (Nationwide League)
- Premier = Liga Al (Premier League)
- Pal. League = Palestine League
- F = Final
- Group = Group stage
- QF = Quarter-finals
- QR1 = First Qualifying Round
- QR2 = Second Qualifying Round
- QR3 = Third Qualifying Round
- QR4 = Fourth Qualifying Round
- RInt = Intermediate Round
- R1 = Round 1
- R2 = Round 2
- R3 = Round 3
- R4 = Round 4
- R5 = Round 5
- R6 = Round 6
- SF = Semi-finals

Champions	Runners-up	Promoted	Relegated
