= 1955–56 Maccabi Jaffa F.C. season =

Maccabi Jaffa
1955–56 season
- Stadium: Maccabi Jaffa Ground, Tel Aviv
- Bet South ('55) Liga Leumit ('56): 1st 10th
- Top goalscorer: League: Baruch Cohen (21); All: Baruch Cohen (26)

The 1955–56 Maccabi Jaffa season was the club's 7th season since its establishment in 1949.

At the start of the season, the league which started during the previous season was completed, with the club finishing 1st in its division and qualifying to the promotion/relegation play-offs against the 10th and 11th placed clubs in Liga Alef, Beitar Jerusalem and Hapoel Kfar Saba, and the Liga Bet North winners, Hapoel Kiryat Haim. Maccabi Jaffa topped the play-offs table and was promoted, for the first time in its existence, to the top division.

At the end of the season, the club placed 10th (out of 12) in the league, which meant the club had to face promotion/relegation play-offs against the first placed team from Liga Alef, Hakoah Tel Aviv. Maccabi Jaffa won both play-off matches and stayed in Liga Leumit.

== Match Results ==
=== Legend ===
Win Draw Loss

=== 1954–55 Liga Bet (south division) ===
The league began on 8 January 1955, and by the time the previous season ended, only 18 rounds of matches were completed, with the final 4 rounds being played during September and October 1955.

==== Final table ====
Pos	Club	P	W	D	L	GF	GA	GR	Pts	
1	Maccabi Jaffa	22	16	4	2	73	21	3.48	36	Promotion\relegation play-offs
2	Hakoah Tel Aviv	22	16	3	3	55	16	3.44	35	
3	Hapoel Jerusalem	22	13	6	3	60	31	1.94	32	
4	Hapoel Mahane Yehuda	22	11	4	7	56	42	1.33	26	
5	Hapoel Rehovot	22	10	4	8	62	44	1.41	24	

==== Matches ====
3 September 1955 19	YMCA Jerusalem	0–7	Maccabi Jaffa	Jerusalem
		Report (p. 8)	20', 47', 56', 60' B. Cohen; 5', 25' Ghougasian; 85' Gal	Stadium: YMCA Stadium; Attendance: 2,000; Referee: Fried

10 September 1955 20	Maccabi Jerusalem	4–3	Maccabi Jaffa	Jerusalem
	Aminoff 32', 50'; Yissachar 35'; Mois 70'	Report (p. 8)	15', 27' Miranda; 38' Ghougasian	Stadium: YMCA Stadium; Attendance: 3,000; Referee: Greenberg

24 September 1955 21	Maccabi Jaffa	5–4	Hakoah Tel Aviv	Tel Aviv
	Miranda 23'; Aroyo 47'; B. Cohen 52', 70'; Gal 80'	Report (p. 8)	46' Ashkenazi; 85' S. Levi; 89' Asa; 90' Sade	Stadium: Maccabi Jaffa Ground; Attendance: 4,000; Referee: Markovich

1 October 1955 22	Maccabi Jaffa	5–1	Beitar Jaffa	Tel Aviv
	Miranda 4', 33', 36', 58'; Hirsch 38'	Report (p. 8)	80' Malachi	Stadium: Maccabi Jaffa Ground; Attendance: 1,500; Referee: Zahavi

==== Results by match ====
Round	1	2	3	4	5	6	7	8	9	10	11	12	13	14	15	16	17	18	19	20	21	22
Result	W	D	W	D	W	W	W	W	W	L	W	W	W	W	D	W	D	W	W	L	W	W
Position	4	5	4	4	3	2	2	2	2	3	2	2	2	2	2	1	1	1	1	2	1	1

Updated to match(es) played on 15 October 1955. Source: 2 Dear Points
W = Win; D = Draw; L = Loss

==== Promotion/relegation play-offs ====
===== Table =====
Pos	Club	P	W	D	L	GF	GA	GR	Pts	Notes
1	Maccabi Jaffa	3	2	1	0	8	2	4.00	5	Liga Leumit
2	Hapoel Kfar Saba	3	1	2	0	5	3	1.67	4	Liga Leumit
3	Hapoel Kiryat Haim	3	1	1	1	5	7	0.71	3	Liga Alef
4	Beitar Jerusalem	3	0	0	3	3	9	0.33	0	Liga Alef

Maccabi Jaffa promoted to Liga Leumit

==== Matches ====
22 October 1955 1	Maccabi Jaffa	4–1	Hapoel Kiryat Haim	Petah Tikva
	Aroyo 36'; Miranda 78', 84'; B. Cohen 79'	Report (p. 8)	34' Handler	Stadium: Maccabi Ground; Attendance: 6,000; Referee: Werner

29 October 1955 2	Hapoel Kfar Saba	1–1	Maccabi Jaffa	Haifa
	Glazer 58'	Report (p. 8)	59' B. Cohen	Stadium: Kiryat Eliezer Stadium; Attendance: 5,000; Referee: Sher

5 November 1955 3	Maccabi Jaffa	3–0	Beitar Jerusalem	Haifa
	B. Cohen 34'; Miranda 41'; Kalev 53'	Report (p. 8)		Stadium: Kiryat Eliezer Stadium; Attendance: 3,000; Referee: N. Cohen

=== 1955–56 Liga Leumit ===
==== Final table ====
Pos	Club	P	W	D	L	GF	GA	GR	Pts	
8	Maccabi Netanya	22	9	2	11	31	44	0.70	20	
9	Hapoel Ramat Gan	22	9	0	13	28	42	0.67	18	
10	Maccabi Jaffa	22	6	5	11	39	48	0.81	17	Promotion/relegation play-offs
11	Maccabi Rehovot	22	6	1	15	25	64	0.39	13	Relegated to Liga Alef
12	Hapoel Kfar Saba	22	3	6	13	20	48	0.42	12	Relegated to Liga Alef

==== Matches ====
3 December 1955 1	Maccabi Jaffa	1–2	Hapoel Haifa	Tel Aviv
	Gal 22'		3' Schneid; 55' Ben David	Stadium: Maccabi Jaffa Ground; Attendance: 3,000; Referee: Dudkevich

10 December 1955 2	Maccabi Petah Tikva	2–0	Maccabi Jaffa	Petah Tikva
	Nadel 3'; Carmeli 43'			Stadium: Maccabi Ground; Attendance: 3,500; Referee: Harp

17 December 1955 3	Hapoel Petah Tikva	4–2	Maccabi Jaffa	Petah Tikva
	Kofman 23', 50', 63'; Zelikovich 80'		86' Ghougasian; 89' B. Cohen	Stadium: Hapoel Ground; Attendance: 3,500; Referee: Markovich

24 December 1955 4	Maccabi Jaffa	2–4	Beitar Tel Aviv	Tel Aviv
	Aroyo 33'; B. Cohen 61'		4', 40' Huli; 26' Arbiv; 30' (pen.) Elmaliah	Stadium: Maccabi Jaffa Ground; Attendance: 2,500; Referee: Werner

31 December 1955 5	Maccabi Tel Aviv	1–1	Maccabi Jaffa	Tel Aviv
	Reznik 73'		90' Aroyo	Stadium: Basa Stadium; Attendance: 4,000; Referee: Sher

7 January 1956 6	Maccabi Jaffa	3–2	Maccabi Haifa	Tel Aviv
	Ghougasian 38', 78'; Miranda 61'		53' Hardy; 85' Almani	Stadium: Maccabi Jaffa Ground; Attendance: 3,000; Referee: Fried

14 January 1956 7	Maccabi Jaffa	2–1	Hapoel Ramat Gan	Tel Aviv
	Herschkovitz 32'; B. Cohen 55'		19' Pulaver	Stadium: Maccabi Jaffa Ground; Referee: Sher

21 January 1956 8	Maccabi Netanya	2–0	Maccabi Jaffa	Netanya
	Sudek 44' (pen.); Shrager 61'			Stadium: Sar-Tov Stadium; Attendance: 3,500; Referee: Werner

11 February 1956 9	Maccabi Jaffa	2–2	Hapoel Tel Aviv	Tel Aviv
	Miranda 46' (pen.); Ghougasian 77'		45' Rosenbaum; 56' (pen.) Balut	Stadium: Maccabi Jaffa Ground; Referee: Frizner

18 February 1956 10	Maccabi Rehovot	3–1	Maccabi Jaffa	Rehovot
	Vider 13', 17'; Mansur 53'		B. Cohen	Stadium: Maccabi Ground; Attendance: 3,000; Referee: Schwartz

26 February 1956 11	Maccabi Jaffa	4–1	Hapoel Kfar Saba	Tel Aviv
	Gal 49'; Herschkovitz 53'; B. Cohen 83', 88'		27' H. Glazer	Stadium: Maccabi Jaffa Ground; Referee: M. Cohen

3 March 1956 12	Hapoel Haifa	3–1	Maccabi Jaffa	Haifa
	Martin 25' (pen.); Schneid 68'; Nestenfober 82'		48' Ghougasian	Stadium: Kiryat Eliezer Stadium; Attendance: 4,000; Referee: M. Cohen

10 March 1956 13	Maccabi Jaffa	1–1	Maccabi Petah Tikva	Tel Aviv
	Aroyo 23'		25' Rabinson	Stadium: Maccabi Jaffa Ground; Attendance: 4,000; Referee: Dudkevich

17 March 1956 14	Maccabi Jaffa	3–3	Hapoel Petah Tikva	Tel Aviv
	Ghougasian 54', 69'; Aroyo 78'		38' Kofman; 59', 63' Stelmach	Stadium: Maccabi Jaffa Ground; Attendance: 3,000; Referee: Frizner

24 March 1956 15	Beitar Tel Aviv	4–0	Maccabi Jaffa	Tel Aviv
	Huli 7'; Kurik 20'; Bar- Zion 34', 80'			Stadium: Basa Stadium; Attendance: 6,000; Referee: Werner

31 March 1956 16	Maccabi Jaffa	0–2	Maccabi Tel Aviv	Tel Aviv
			32' Reznik; 54' Merimovich	Stadium: Maccabi Jaffa Ground

7 April 1956 17	Maccabi Haifa	5–1	Maccabi Jaffa	Haifa
	Held 10', 22', 87'; Menchel 45'; Hardy 67'		34' B. Cohen	Stadium: Kiryat Eliezer Stadium; Attendance: 4,000; Referee: Rosenbaum

14 April 1956 18	Hapoel Ramat Gan	2–5	Maccabi Jaffa	Givatayim
	Mesika 50'; Kirschenberg 88'		21', 22', 31' B. Cohen; 33' Kalev; 60' Aroyo	Stadium: HaMakhtesh Stadium; Referee: Dudkevitch

22 April 1956 19	Maccabi Jaffa	2–3	Maccabi Netanya	Tel Aviv
	Aroyo 78'; Besserglick 81' (pen.)		7', 42' Lemel; 11' Statski	Stadium: Maccabi Jaffa Ground; Referee: M. Cohen

19 May 1956 20	Hapoel Tel Aviv	0–2	Maccabi Jaffa	Tel Aviv
			Ghougasian 42'; Kalev 50'	Stadium: Basa Stadium; Referee: Sher

27 May 1956 21	Maccabi Jaffa	6–1	Maccabi Rehovot	Tel Aviv
	B. Cohen 15', 42', 59', 61', 77'; Ghougasian 51'		19' Litvak	Stadium: Maccabi Jaffa Ground; Attendance: 3,500

2 June 1956 22	Hapoel Kfar Saba	0–0	Maccabi Jaffa	Kfar Saba
				Stadium: Hapoel Ground; Referee: Sher

==== Results by match ====
Round	1	2	3	4	5	6	7	8	9	10	11	12	13	14	15	16	17	18	19	20	21	22
Result	L	L	L	L	D	W	W	L	D	L	W	L	D	D	L	L	L	W	L	W	W	D
Position	10	12	12	12	12	10	8	9	9	11	9	10	10	10	10	11	11	11	11	10	10	10

Updated to match(es) played on 2 June 1956. Source: IFA
W = Win; D = Draw; L = Loss

==== Promotion/relegation play-offs ====
9 June 1956 1	Maccabi Jaffa	3–1	Hakoah Tel Aviv	Tel Aviv
	B. Cohen 32', 53'; Kalev 72'	Davar	74' Ashkenazi	Stadium: Maccabi Jaffa Ground; Attendance: 5000; Referee: Frizner

16 June 1956 2	Hakoah Tel Aviv	0–1	Maccabi Jaffa	Tel Aviv
		Davar	18' Ghougasian	Stadium: Hatikva Neighborhood Stadium; Attendance: 4000; Referee: Werner

Maccabi Jaffa won 4–1 on aggregate and remained in Liga Leumit. Hakoah Tel Aviv remained in Liga Alef.
