= 1955–56 Maccabi Petah Tikva F.C. season =

Maccabi Petah Tikva
1955–56 season
- Manager: Eliezer Spiegel
- Stadium: Maccabi Ground, Petah Tikva
- Liga Alef (1955) Liga Leumit (1956): 7th 4th
- State Cup: Quarter-finals
- Top goalscorer: Eliezer Spiegel (17)

The 1955–56 Maccabi Petah Tikva season was the club's 45th season since its establishment in 1912, and 8th since the establishment of the State of Israel.

At the start of the season, the league which started during the previous season was completed, with the club finishing 7th. The new league season, with the top division being renamed Liga Leumit, began on 3 December 1955 and was completed on 3 June 1956, with the club finishing 4th.

During the season, the club also competed in the State Cup, which was also carried over the summer break. The club was eliminated in the quarter-finals, after losing 0–1 in extra time to Hapoel Ramat Gan, with an own goal scored by goalkeeper Haim Buch, as a corner kick bounced off his shoulder into the goal in the 119th minute.

In addition, during the break between the completion of the 1954–55 league and the beginning of the 1955–56 league, the club participated in the Netanya 25th anniversary cup, along with Beitar Tel Aviv, Maccabi Netanya and Hapoel Ramat Gan. In the competition, which was played as a round-robin tournament, the club finished first, winning the cup.

== Match Results ==
=== Legend ===
Win Draw Loss

=== International friendly matches ===
During the season Maccabi Petah Tikva played two international friendly matches, losing both matches.

19 February 1956	Maccabi Petah Tikva	1–2	(Austria) Kapfenberger SV	Petah Tikva
	Nadel 41'	Davar (in Hebrew)	65', 80' Sillaber	Stadium: Hapoel Ground; Attendance: 3,000; Referee: Rosenbaum

3 May 1956	Maccabi Petah Tikva	2–3	(England) Sunderland	Ramat Gan
	Scharf 20'; Turkenitz 68' (pen.)		7', 36', 69' Fleming	Stadium: Ramat Gan Stadium; Attendance: 10,000; Referee: Frizner

=== 1954–55 Liga Alef ===
The league began on 6 February 1955, and by the time the previous season ended, only 20 rounds of matches were completed, with the final 6 rounds being played during September and October 1955.

==== Final table ====
Pos	Club	P	W	D	L	GF	GA	GR	Pts
5	Beitar Tel Aviv	26	12	5	9	64	47	1.36	29
6	Maccabi Haifa	26	11	6	9	54	41	1.32	28
7	Maccabi Petah Tikva	26	10	7	9	37	41	0.90	27
8	Maccabi Rehovot	26	11	4	11	49	48	1.02	26
9	Hapoel Haifa	26	9	6	11	40	55	0.73	24

==== Matches ====
3 September 1955 21	Maccabi Petah Tikva	5–4	Hapoel Kfar Saba	Petah Tikva
	Tukenitz 13'; I. Ben-Dror 15'; Spiegel 47', 59'; Carmeli 56'	Report (p. 8)	2' Tzahobel; 7' H. Glazer; 69' (pen.), 71' (pen.) Bulman	Stadium: Hapoel Ground; Attendance: 1,000; Referee: Frizner

10 September 1955 22	Hapoel Ramat Gan	5–0	Maccabi Petah Tikva	Givatayim
	R. Cohen 40', 75'; Fritzner 47', 66'; Pulaver 80'	Report (p. 8)		Stadium: HaMakhtesh Stadium; Attendance: 1,000; Referee: Fried

24 September 1955 23	Maccabi Petah Tikva	0–1	Maccabi Netanya	Petah Tikva
		Report (p. 8)	42' Y. Spiegel	Stadium: Maccabi Ground; Attendance: 1,200; Referee: Scheindling

1 October 1955 24	Maccabi Petah Tikva	2–1	Maccabi Tel Aviv	Petah Tikva
	Rabinson 2'; Turkenitz 61' (pen.)	Report (p. 8)	80' Israeli	Stadium: Maccabi Ground; Attendance: 3,000; Referee: Markovich

8 October 1955 25	Beitar Tel Aviv	3–0	Maccabi Petah Tikva	Tel Aviv
	Elmaliah 65', 77'; Azani 90'	Report (p. 8)		Stadium: Basa Stadium; Attendance: 4,000; Referee: Fried

15 October 1955 26	Maccabi Petah Tikva	3–3	Maccabi Haifa	Petah Tikva
	Spiegel 31'; Itzhaki 36'; Leba 89' (pen.)	Report (p. 8)	47' Held; 73', 81' Hardy	Stadium: Maccabi Ground; Attendance: 1,000; Referee: Fried

==== Results by match ====
Round	1	2	3	4	5	6	7	8	9	10	11	12	13	14	15	16	17	18	19	20	21	22	23	24	25	26
Result	L	L	W	W	L	D	W	W	W	D	D	W	W	D	D	W	L	L	L	D	W	L	L	W	L	D
Position	11	14	11	6	10	10	7	5	4	5	5	4	3	3	4	4	4	4	5	5	5	7	7	6	7	7

Updated to match(es) played on 15 October 1955. Source: 2 Dear Points
W = Win; D = Draw; L = Loss

=== 1955–56 Liga Leumit ===
==== Final table ====
Pos	Club	P	W	D	L	GF	GA	GR	Pts
2	Hapoel Petah Tikva	22	12	5	5	54	28	1.93	29
3	Hapoel Tel Aviv	22	12	5	5	49	29	1.69	29
4	Maccabi Petah Tikva	22	10	7	5	47	34	1.38	27
5	Maccabi Haifa	22	11	3	8	51	29	1.76	25
6	Hapoel Haifa	22	9	4	9	32	39	0.82	22

==== Matches ====
3 December 1955 1	Maccabi Petah Tikva	3–3	Maccabi Tel Aviv	Petah Tikva
	Bernard 2', 17'; I. Ben-Dror 28' (pen.)		5' Studinski; 25' Merimovich; 66' Israeli	Stadium: Maccabi Ground; Attendance: 4,000; Referee: Frizner

10 December 1955 2	Maccabi Petah Tikva	2–0	Maccabi Jaffa	Petah Tikva
	Nadel 3'; Carmeli 43'			Stadium: Maccabi Ground; Attendance: 3,500; Referee: Harp

17 December 1955 3	Beitar Tel Aviv	2–3	Maccabi Petah Tikva	Tel Aviv
	Huli 47'; Elmaliah 79', pen.'		19' Nadel; 60', 83' Bernard	Stadium: Basa Stadium; Attendance: 3,000; Referee: Hillman

24 December 1955 4	Maccabi Petah Tikva	7–1	Hapoel Kfar Saba	Petah Tikva
	Spiegel 34', 59'; I. Ben-Dror 37', 51'; Levkovich 23'; Bernard 56'; Carmeli 61'		74' (pen.) Bulman	Stadium: Maccabi Ground; Attendance: 2,000; Referee: Markovich

31 December 1955 5	Hapoel Ramat Gan	0–3	Maccabi Petah Tikva	Givatayim
			47' (o.g.) Manar; 74', 82' Nadel	Stadium: HaMakhtesh Stadium; Attendance: 2,000; Referee: Werner

7 January 1956 6	Maccabi Netanya	0–0	Maccabi Petah Tikva	Netanya
				Stadium: Sar-Tov Stadium; Referee: Sher

14 January 1956 7	Maccabi Petah Tikva	4–4	Hapoel Tel Aviv	Petah Tikva
	Carmeli 14'; I. Ben-Dror 45', 64' (pen.), 71'		23' (pen.) Balut; 47' B. Goldstein; 72', 79' Michaelov	Stadium: Maccabi Ground; Attendance: 3,500; Referee: Hillman

21 January 1956 8	Maccabi Petah Tikva	1–0	Maccabi Rehovot	Petah Tikva
	Spiegel 62'			Stadium: Maccabi Ground; Attendance: 1,500; Referee: Klein

11 February 1956 9	Maccabi Haifa	1–3	Maccabi Petah Tikva	Haifa
	Levi 9'		16', 17' Spiegel; 67' Carmeli	Stadium: Kiryat Eliezer Stadium; Attendance: 5,537; Referee: Dudkevich

18 February 1956 10	Maccabi Petah Tikva	4–4	Hapoel Petah Tikva	Petah Tikva
	Spiegel 7'; Nadel 61', 64'; Bernard 68'		14', 35' Stelmach; 74' Kofman; 80' Nahari	Stadium: Maccabi Ground; Attendance: 4,000; Referee: Werner

25 February 1956 11	Hapoel Haifa	3–2	Maccabi Petah Tikva	Haifa
	Schneid 24', 63'; Schlanger 45'		40' Spiegel; 82' Rabinson	Stadium: Kiryat Eliezer Stadium; Attendance: 5,000; Referee: Rosenbaum

3 March 1956 12	Maccabi Tel Aviv	2–0	Maccabi Petah Tikva	Tel Aviv
	Y. Fuchs 33'; Schneor 64' (pen.)			Stadium: Basa Stadium; Referee: Werner

10 March 1956 13	Maccabi Jaffa	1–1	Maccabi Petah Tikva	Tel Aviv
	Aroyo 23'		25' Rabinson	Stadium: Maccabi Jaffa Ground; Attendance: 4,000; Referee: Dudkevich

17 March 1956 14	Maccabi Petah Tikva	0–3	Beitar Tel Aviv	Petah Tikva
			32' Bar-Zion; 56', 74' Elmaliah	Stadium: Maccabi Ground; Attendance: 3,000; Referee: Dudkevich

24 March 1956 15	Hapoel Kfar Saba	1–1	Maccabi Petah Tikva	Kfar Saba
	Glazer 38'		22' Scharf	Stadium: Hapoel Ground; Referee: Frizner

31 March 1956 16	Maccabi Petah Tikva	3–1	Hapoel Ramat Gan	Petah Tikva
	Nadel 5'; Turkenitz 36'; Spiegel 55'		7' Kirschenberg	Stadium: Maccabi Ground; Referee: Sher

7 April 1956 17	Maccabi Petah Tikva	4–1	Maccabi Netanya	Petah Tikva
	Rabinson 50'; Scharf 65', 73'; I. Ben-Dror 79' (pen.)		6' Shrager	Stadium: Maccabi Ground

14 April 1956 18	Hapoel Tel Aviv	2–0	Maccabi Petah Tikva	Tel Aviv
	Yehudayoff 57'; Balut 71' (pen.)			Stadium: Basa Stadium; Attendance: 6,037; Referee: Ben-Rubi

22 April 1956 19	Maccabi Rehovot	1–2	Maccabi Petah Tikva	Rehovot
	Vider 50'		23', 55' Spiegel	Stadium: Maccabi Ground; Referee: Dudkevich

19 May 1956 20	Maccabi Petah Tikva	2–0	Maccabi Haifa	Petah Tikva
	Spiegel 35'; Scharf 72'			Stadium: Maccabi Ground, Petah Tikva

27 May 1956 21	Hapoel Petah Tikva	3–1	Maccabi Petah Tikva	Petah Tikva
	Z. Ratzabi 1'; Stelmach 27'; Nahari 74'		4' Spiegel	Stadium: Hapoel Ground; Attendance: 5,000; Referee: Frizner

2 June 1956 22	Maccabi Petah Tikva	1–1	Hapoel Haifa	Petah Tikva
	Spiegel 35'		48' Ginzburg	Stadium: Maccabi Ground

==== Results by match ====
Round	1	2	3	4	5	6	7	8	9	10	11	12	13	14	15	16	17	18	19	20	21	22
Result	D	W	W	W	W	D	D	W	W	D	L	L	D	L	D	W	W	L	W	W	L	D
Position	5	3	3	2	1	2	2	1	1	1	1	2	3	4	4	4	4	5	4	3	4	4

Updated to match(es) played on 28 July 1956. Source: IFA
W = Win; D = Draw; L = Loss

=== State Cup ===
27 August 1955 QF	Maccabi Petah Tikva	0–1 (a.e.t.)	Hapoel Ramat Gan	Petah Tikva
		Report (p. 8)	119' (o.g.) Buch	Stadium: Hapoel Ground; Attendance: 2,000; Referee: Markovich

=== Netanya 25th Anniversary Cup ===
In October and November, while the promotion playoffs and the State Cup were being played, two cup competitions were organized by Liga Leumit Clubs, the second edition of the Shapira Cup, and the Netanya 25th Anniversary Cup. Maccabi Netanya, Maccabi Petah Tikva, Maccabi Petah Tikva and Hapoel Ramat Gan took part in the competition, dedicated to the 25th anniversary of Netanya.

==== Table ====
Pos	Team	Pld	W	D	L	GF	GA	GR	Pts	Qualification
1	Maccabi Petah Tikva	3	2	1	0	14	5	2.800	5	Winners
2	Hapoel Ramat Gan	3	1	1	1	8	7	1.143	3	
3	Maccabi Netanya	3	1	1	1	5	7	0.714	3	
4	Beitar Tel Aviv	3	0	1	2	7	15	0.467	1	

Source: Hadshot HaSport, p. 1

29 October 1955 1	Maccabi Netanya	0–4	Maccabi Petah Tikva	Givatayim
		Report (p. 8)	3', 37' I. Ben Dror; 16' Spiegel; 77' Nadel	Stadium: HaMakhtesh Stadium; Attendance: 1,500; Referee: Metzler

5 November 1955 2	Maccabi Petah Tikva	8–3	Beitar Tel Aviv	Petah Tikva
	Spiegel 6', 35', 44'; Bernard , 52'; Nadel 31', 73'; Turkenitz 33'	Report (p. 8)	, 80' Gleit; 81' Arbiv	Stadium: Maccabi Ground; Attendance: 2,000; Referee: Schiendling

12 November 1955 3	Hapoel Ramat Gan	2–2	Maccabi Petah Tikva	Netanya
	I. Ben-Dror 43'; Levkovich 81'	Report (p. 8)	52' Radler; 67' Chronsich	Stadium: Sar-Tov Stadium; Attendance: 2,000; Referee: Rosenbaum
