= 1955–56 Beitar Tel Aviv F.C. season =

Beitar Tel Aviv
1955–56 season
- Manager: Alois Hess
- Stadium: Maccabi Jaffa Ground, Tel Aviv
- Liga Alef (1955) Liga Leumit (1956): 5th 7th
- State Cup: Quarter-finals
- Top goalscorer: League: Elmaliah, Huli (32); All: Nisim Elmaliah (34)

The 1955–56 Beitar Tel Aviv season was the club's 23rd season since its establishment, in 1934, and 8th since the establishment of the State of Israel.

At the start of the season, the league which started during the previous season was completed, with the club finishing 5th. The new league season, with the top division being renamed Liga Leumit, began on 3 December 1955 and was completed on 3 June 1956, with the club finishing 7th.

During the season, the club also competed in the State Cup, which was also carried over the summer break. The club was eliminated in the quarter-finals, after losing 0–4 to Hapoel Petah Tikva.

In addition, during the break between the completion of the 1954–55 league and the beginning of the 1955–56 league, the club participated in the Netanya 25th anniversary cup, along with Maccabi Petah Tikva, Maccabi Netanya and Hapoel Ramat Gan. In the competition, which was played as a round-robin tournament, the club finished fourth.

== Match Results ==
=== Legend ===
Win Draw Loss

=== 1954–55 Liga Alef ===
The league began on 6 February 1955, and by the time the previous season ended, only 20 rounds of matches were completed, with the final 6 rounds being played during September and October 1955.

==== Final table ====
Pos	Club	P	W	D	L	GF	GA	GR	Pts
3	Hapoel Tel Aviv	26	12	9	5	49	23	2.13	33
4	Maccabi Netanya	26	13	7	6	54	43	1.26	33
5	Beitar Tel Aviv	26	12	5	9	64	47	1.36	29
6	Maccabi Haifa	26	11	6	9	54	41	1.32	28
7	Maccabi Petah Tikva	26	10	7	9	37	41	0.90	27

==== Matches ====
3 September 1955 21	Hapoel Balfouria	1–8	Beitar Tel Aviv	Afula
	Bentov 85'	Report (p. 8)	27' Huli; 34', 39', 51', 57' (pen.), 79' Elmaliah; 44', 56' Bar-Zion	Stadium: Hapoel Ground; Attendance: 600; Referee: Moshe Cohen

10 September 1955 22	Hapoel Haifa	1–0	Beitar Tel Aviv	Haifa
	Gilerman 3'	Report (p. 8)		Stadium: Kiryat Haim Stadium; Attendance: 2,500; Referee: Werner

24 September 1955 23	Beitar Tel Aviv	2–5	Maccabi Rehovot	Tel Aviv
	Bar-Zion 28'; Huli 66'	Report (p. 8)	40' Schmilovich; 42', 78' Litvak; 84', 89' Herschkovitz	Stadium: Basa Stadium; Attendance: 4,000; Referee: Cohen

1 October 1955 24	Hapoel Tel Aviv	3–0	Beitar Tel Aviv	Tel Aviv
	Sheli 23', 90'; Michaelov 73'	Report (p. 8)		Stadium: Basa Stadium; Attendance: 5,000; Referee: Hillman

8 October 1955 25	Beitar Tel Aviv	3–0	Maccabi Petah Tikva	Tel Aviv
	Elmaliah 65', 77'; Azani 90'	Report (p. 8)		Stadium: Basa Stadium; Attendance: 4,000; Referee: Fried

15 October 1955 26	Hapoel Kfar Saba	1–3	Beitar Tel Aviv	Kfar Saba
	Ratz 65'	Report (p. 8)	1' Elmaliah; 2', 12' Gleit	Stadium: Hapoel Ground; Attendance: 2,500; Referee: Sher

==== Results by match ====
Round	1	2	3	4	5	6	7	8	9	10	11	12	13	14	15	16	17	18	19	20	21	22	23	24	25	26
Result	W	W	L	W	L	L	W	W	W	W	D	L	D	D	L	L	D	D	W	W	W	L	L	L	W	W
Position	1	3	5	4	4	6	5	4	3	3	3	3	4	4	5	5	5	5	4	4	4	4	6	7	6	5

Updated to match(es) played on 15 October 1955. Source: 2 Dear Points
W = Win; D = Draw; L = Loss

=== 1955–56 Liga Leumit ===
==== Final table ====
Pos	Club	P	W	D	L	GF	GA	GR	Pts
5	Maccabi Haifa	22	11	3	8	51	29	1.76	25
6	Hapoel Haifa	22	9	4	9	32	39	0.82	22
7	Beitar Tel Aviv	22	10	0	12	42	44	0.95	20
8	Maccabi Netanya	22	9	2	11	31	44	0.70	20
9	Hapoel Ramat Gan	22	9	0	13	28	42	0.67	18

==== Matches ====
3 December 1955 1	Beitar Tel Aviv	6–3	Maccabi Rehovot	Tel Aviv
	Huli 1', 25', 54', 58'; Elmaliah 38', 60'		20' Vider; 82', 85' Litvak	Stadium: Basa Stadium; Attendance: 3,000; Referee: Dudkevich

10 December 1955 2	Hapoel Haifa	1–3	Beitar Tel Aviv	Haifa
	Diamant 45'		57' Huli; 60' Shchinik; 70' Gleit	Stadium: Kiryat Eliezer Stadium; Attendance: 1,000; Referee: Zahavi

17 December 1955 3	Beitar Tel Aviv	2–3	Maccabi Petah Tikva	Tel Aviv
	Huli 47'; Elmaliah 79', pen.'		19' Nadel; 60', 83' Bernard	Stadium: Basa Stadium; Attendance: 3,000; Referee: Hillman

24 December 1955 4	Maccabi Jaffa	2–4	Beitar Tel Aviv	Tel Aviv
	Aroyo 33'; B. Cohen 61'		4', 40' Huli; 26' Arbiv; 30' (pen.) Elmaliah	Stadium: Maccabi Jaffa Ground; Attendance: 2,500; Referee: Werner

31 December 1955 5	Hapoel Petah Tikva	2–0	Beitar Tel Aviv	Petah Tikva
	Kofman 12' (pen.); Zelikovich 72'			Stadium: Hapoel Ground; Attendance: 3,000; Referee: Frizner

7 January 1956 6	Maccabi Tel Aviv	2–3	Beitar Tel Aviv	Tel Aviv
	Studinski 75'; Nahmias 78'		31' Elmaliah; 70' Huli; 89' Bar-Zion	Stadium: Basa Stadium; Referee: Ben-Rubi

14 January 1956 7	Beitar Tel Aviv	1–6	Maccabi Haifa	Tel Aviv
	Huli 90'		2', 38', 47' Georgiou; 27' Hardy; 51' Held; 84' S. Levi	Stadium: Maccabi Jaffa Ground; Referee: Werner

21 January 1956 8	Hapoel Ramat Gan	0–3	Beitar Tel Aviv	Givatayim
			6' (pen.) Elmaliah; 23', 60' Bar Zion	Stadium: HaMakhtesh Stadium; Attendance: 2,500; Referee: Cohen

11 February 1956 9	Beitar Tel Aviv	3–2	Hapoel Kfar Saba	Tel Aviv
	Bar-Zion 20'; Huli 33'; Strugo 34'		28' Lutotovski; 63' H. Glazer	Stadium: Maccabi Jaffa Ground; Attendance: 4,000; Referee: Schwartz

18 February 1956 10	Hapoel Tel Aviv	3–1	Beitar Tel Aviv	Tel Aviv
	Weiss 30'; Michaelov 63'; Rosenbaum 81'		28' Bar-zion	Stadium: Basa Stadium; Attendance: 6,000; Referee: Moshe Cohen

25 February 1956 11	Maccabi Netanya	1–0	Beitar Tel Aviv	Netanya
	Caspi 60'			Stadium: Sar-Tov Stadium; Attendance: 2,500; Referee: Schwartz

3 March 1956 12	Maccabi Rehovot	1–0	Beitar Tel Aviv	Rehovot
	Litvak 74' (pen.)			Stadium: Maccabi Ground; Attendance: 1,200; Referee: Halperin

10 March 1956 13	Beitar Tel Aviv	2–3	Hapoel Haifa	Tel Aviv
	Huli 49'; Arbiv 81'		51' Ginzburg; 63' (pen.) Martin; 72' M. Simantiris	Stadium: Maccabi Jaffa Ground; Referee: Schwartz

17 March 1956 14	Maccabi Petah Tikva	0–3	Beitar Tel Aviv	Petah Tikva
			32' Bar-Zion; 56', 74' Elmaliah	Stadium: Maccabi Ground; Attendance: 3,000; Referee: Dudkevich

24 March 1956 15	Beitar Tel Aviv	4–0	Maccabi Jaffa	Tel Aviv
	Huli 7'; Kurik 20'; Bar- Zion 34', 80'			Stadium: Basa Stadium; Attendance: 6,000; Referee: Werner

31 March 1956 16	Beitar Tel Aviv	1–2	Hapoel Petah Tikva	Tel Aviv
	Arbiv 61'		1' Stelmach; 59' Z. Ratzabi	Stadium: Maccabi Jaffa Ground; Attendance: 6,000; Referee: Ben-Rubi

7 April 1956 17	Beitar Tel Aviv	1–2	Maccabi Tel Aviv	Tel Aviv
	Elmaliah 64'		15' Israeli; 59' Nahmias	Stadium: Maccabi Jaffa Ground; Referee: Moshe Cohen

14 April 1956 18	Maccabi Haifa	4–2	Beitar Tel Aviv	Haifa
	Hardy 7', 52'; Held 10', 55'		39' Gleit; 73' Huli	Stadium: Kiryat Eliezer Stadium; Attendance: 5,000; Referee: Hillman

22 April 1956 19	Beitar Tel Aviv	1–0	Hapoel Ramat Gan	Tel Aviv
	Elmaliah 37'			Stadium: Maccabi Jaffa Ground; Attendance: 3,000; Referee: Werner

19 May 1956 20	Hapoel Kfar Saba	2–0	Beitar Tel Aviv	Kfar Saba
	H. Glazer 64' (pen.); Tobiash 69'			Stadium: Hapoel Ground; Attendance: 2,000; Referee: Frizner

27 May 1956 21	Beitar Tel Aviv	0–5	Hapoel Tel Aviv	Tel Aviv
			19', 88' Rosenbaum; 15', 32' Michaelov; 59' Yehudayoff	Stadium: Basa Stadium; Attendance: 4,000; Referee: Hillman

2 June 1956 22	Beitar Tel Aviv	2–0	Maccabi Netanya	Tel Aviv
	Arbiv 6'; Huli 34'			Stadium: Basa Stadium; Attendance: 10,000; Referee: Dudkevich

==== Results by match ====
Round	1	2	3	4	5	6	7	8	9	10	11	12	13	14	15	16	17	18	19	20	21	22
Result	W	W	L	W	L	W	L	W	W	L	L	L	L	W	W	L	L	L	W	L	L	W
Position	2	2	4	4	6	4	6	5	4	5	6	7	7	7	6	6	7	7	7	7	8	7

Updated to match(es) played on 28 July 1956. Source: IFA
W = Win; D = Draw; L = Loss

=== State Cup ===
27 August 1955 QF	Beitar Tel Aviv	0–4	Hapoel Petah Tikva	Tel Aviv
		Report (p. 8)	47', 59' Chirik; 61' Stelmach; 75' Zelikovich	Stadium: Basa Stadium; Attendance: 7,000; Referee: Frizner

=== Netanya 25th Anniversary Cup ===
In October and November, while the promotion playoffs and the State Cup were being played, two cup competitions were organized by Liga Leumit Clubs, the second edition of the Shapira Cup, and the Netanya 25th Anniversary Cup. Maccabi Netanya, Beitar Tel Aviv, Maccabi Petah Tikva and Hapoel Ramat Gan took part in the competition, dedicated to the 25th anniversary of Netanya.

==== Table ====
Pos	Team	Pld	W	D	L	GF	GA	GR	Pts	Qualification
1	Maccabi Petah Tikva	3	2	1	0	14	5	2.800	5	Winners
2	Hapoel Ramat Gan	3	1	1	1	8	7	1.143	3	
3	Maccabi Netanya	3	1	1	1	5	7	0.714	3	
4	Beitar Tel Aviv	3	0	1	2	7	15	0.467	1	

Source: Hadshot HaSport, p. 1

29 October 1955 1	Hapoel Ramat Gan	5–2	Beitar Tel Aviv	Givatayim
	Chronsich 3', 78'; Kirschenberg 11' (pen.), 69', 73'	Report (p. 8)	20' Osherov; 57' Emaliah	Stadium: HaMakhtesh Stadium; Attendance: 2,500; Referee: Metzler

5 November 1955 2	Maccabi Petah Tikva	8–3	Beitar Tel Aviv	Petah Tikva
	Spiegel 6', 35', 44'; Bernard , 52'; Nadel 31', 73'; Turkenitz 33'	Report (p. 8)	?', 80' Gleit; 81' Arbiv	Stadium: Maccabi Ground; Attendance: 2,000; Referee: Schiendling

12 November 1955 3	Maccabi Netanya	2–2	Beitar Tel Aviv	Netanya
	Lemel 23'; Meller 40'	Report (p. 8)	22' Emaliah; 65' Arbiv	Stadium: Sar-Tov Stadium; Attendance: 3,000; Referee: Dudkevich
