= 1954–55 Beitar Tel Aviv F.C. season =

Beitar Tel Aviv
1954–55 season
- Manager: Haim Reich
- Stadium: Basa Stadium, Tel Aviv
- Liga Alef: not completed
- State Cup: not completed
- Top goalscorer: League: Nisim Elmaliah (25); All: Nisim Elmaliah (31)

The 1954–55 Beitar Tel Aviv season was the club's 22nd season since its establishment, in 1934, and 7th since the establishment of the State of Israel.

During the season, the club competed in Liga Alef (top division) and the State Cup. In addition, the club played in the privately organized Shapira Cup, a four-club league competition.

== Review and events ==
- At the beginning of the season, top Beitar teams, Beitar Tel Aviv and Beitar Jerusalem competed for the Lifa Livyatan Memorial Cup, named after a late Beitar journalist. In the first match, played on 28 August 1954, the teams tied 3–3, and the match was replayed on 12 October 1954, Beitar Tel Aviv winning 5–2.
- During December 1954 and January 1955, as no league matches were played due to a dispute between Hapoel, Maccabi and Beitar factions in the IFA, Hapoel Tel Aviv organized a league competition for the top Tel Aviv teams, Hapoel, Maccabi, Beitar and Maccabi Jaffa. The competition was played as a double round-robin tournament, with the top placed team winning the cup, named after former Hapoel Tel Aviv treasurer, Yosef Shapira. The club won two matches and lost four, finishing third.
- The club played one international friendly match during the season, against AC Omonia, on 31 May 1955, winning 4–2.

== Match results ==
=== Legend ===
Win Draw Loss

=== Liga Alef ===
League matches began on 6 February 1955, and by the time the season, only 20 rounds of matches were completed, delaying the end of the league season to the next season.

==== League table (as of 2 July 1955) ====
Pos	Team	Pld	W	D	L	GF	GA	GR	Pts
2	Hapoel Petah Tikva	20	13	4	3	38	15	2.533	30
3	Hapoel Tel Aviv	20	9	8	3	37	17	2.176	26
4	Beitar Tel Aviv	20	9	5	6	48	36	1.333	23
5	Maccabi Petah Tikva	20	8	6	6	27	24	1.125	22
6	Maccabi Haifa	20	8	5	7	36	29	1.241	21

Updated to match(es) played on 2 July 1955. Source: Hadshot HaSport, 3 July 1955 (in Hebrew)

==== Matches ====
5 February 1955 1	Hapoel Ramat Gan	0–3	Beitar Tel Aviv	Givatayim
		Report (p. 8)	20' Elmaliah; 23' Gleit; 47' Huli	Stadium: HaMakhtesh Stadium; Attendance: 1,500; Referee: Werner

12 February 1955 2	Beitar Tel Aviv	2–1	Maccabi Netanya	Tel Aviv
	Huli 48' (pen.); Elmaliah 57'	Report (p. 8)	21' Statzki	Stadium: Basa Stadium; Attendance: 2,500; Referee: Markovich

19 February 1955 3	Maccabi Tel Aviv	3–1	Beitar Tel Aviv	Tel Aviv
	Rabinovich 12'; Israeli 18'; Studinski 85'	Report (p. 8)	46' Huli	Stadium: Basa Stadium; Attendance: 8,000; Referee: Klein

26 February 1955 4	Beitar Tel Aviv	4–0	Beitar Jerusalem	Tel Aviv
	Osherov 61', 83'; Elmaliah 61', 75'	Report (p. 8)		Stadium: Basa Stadium; Attendance: 4,000; Referee: Ben-Rubi

5 March 1955 5	Beitar Tel Aviv	0–2	Maccabi Haifa	Tel Aviv
		Report	37' Daniel; 62' Held	Stadium: Basa Stadium; Attendance: 2,000; Referee: Frisner

12 March 1955 6	Hapoel Petah Tikva	4–0	Beitar Tel Aviv	Petah Tikva
	Chirik 4', 49'; Stelmach 84'; Kofman 87'	Report (p. 8)		Stadium: Hapoel Ground, Petah Tikva; Attendance: 1,500; Referee: Fried

19 March 1955 7	Hapoel Hadera	2–5	Beitar Tel Aviv	Hadera
	Gali 44'; Salomon 75'	Report (p. 8)	29' Huli; 45' (o.g.) Weinberg; 64', 84' Elmaliah; 77' Bar-Zion	Stadium: Hapoel Ground; Attendance: 1,000; Referee: Klein

2 April 1955 8	Beitar Tel Aviv	6–1	Hapoel Balfouria	Tel Aviv
	Huli 8', 21', 24'; Elmaliah 55', 57', 90'		89' Gordon	Stadium: Basa Stadium

9 April 1955 9	Beitar Tel Aviv	4–2	Hapoel Haifa	Tel Aviv
	Emaliah 20'; Huli 59', 70'; Gleit 62'	Report (p. 8)	68' Kramer; 87' (pen.) Martin	Stadium: Basa Stadium; Attendance: 2,000; Referee: Moshe Cohen

13 April 1955 10	Maccabi Rehovot	2–7	Beitar Tel Aviv	Rehovot
	Shrager 25'; Kofman 82'	Report (p. 4)	23' (pen.), 55' (pen.), 74', 89' Huli; 52', 62' (pen.) Elmaliah; 70' Bar-Zion	Stadium: Maccabi Ground; Attendance: 1,500; Referee: Fried

16 April 1955 11	Hapoel Tel Aviv	1–1	Beitar Tel Aviv	Tel Aviv
	Yehudayoff 50'	Report (p. 8)	53' Huli	Stadium: Basa Stadium; Attendance: 9,000; Referee: Frizner

23 April 1955 12	Maccabi Petah Tikva	4–2	Beitar Tel Aviv	Petah Tikva
	Spiegel 8'; Rabinson 24'; Turkenitz 63' (pen.); Carmeli 68'	Report (p. 8)	12' Bar-Zion; 17' HaMeiri	Stadium: Maccabi Ground; Attendance: 4,000; Referee: Parnas

30 April 1955 13	Beitar Tel Aviv	1–1	Hapoel Kfar Saba	Tel Aviv
	Y. Gambash 58'	Report (p. 8)	86' Tobiash	Stadium: Maccabi Jaffa Ground; Attendance: 3,000; Referee: Sher

14 May 1955 14	Beitar Tel Aviv	1–1	Hapoel Ramat Gan	Tel Aviv
	Elmaliah 24'	Report (p. 8)	12' Radler	Stadium: Basa Stadium; Attendance: 3,500; Referee: Sher

21 May 1955 15	Maccabi Netanya	3–1	Beitar Tel Aviv	Netanya
	Meller 12', 26'; I. Caspi 22'	Report (p. 8)	80' Elmaliah	Stadium: Sar-Tov Stadium; Attendance: 4,000; Referee: Scheindling

4 June 1955 16	Beitar Tel Aviv	3–0 (w/o) (abandoned)	Maccabi Tel Aviv	Tel Aviv
		Report (p. 8)	5' Glazer; 36' (pen.) Turika	Stadium: Basa Stadium; Attendance: 4,500; Referee: Sher

11 June 1955 17	Beitar Jerusalem	3–3	Beitar Tel Aviv	Jerusalem
	Hasson 8'; Yehezkel 12'; Elfasi 38'	Report (p. 8)	61' (pen.), 80', 85' Elmaliah	Stadium: YMCA Stadium; Attendance: 5,000; Referee: Metzler

18 June 1955 18	Maccabi Haifa	1–1	Beitar Tel Aviv	Haifa
	Hardy 23'	Report	52' Kasuto	Stadium: Kiryat Haim Stadium; Attendance: 3,500; Referee: Dudkevich

26 June 1955 19	Beitar Tel Aviv	2–1	Hapoel Petah Tikva	Tel Aviv
	Elmaliah 14'; Huli 52'	Report (p. 8)	53' Stelmach	Stadium: Basa Stadium; Attendance: 5,000; Referee: Werner

2 July 1955 20	Beitar Tel Aviv	4–1	Hapoel Hadera	Tel Aviv
	Elmaliah 70' (pen.), 76', 85', 90'	Report (p. 8)	65' Salomon	Stadium: Basa Stadium; Attendance: 3,000; Referee: Scheindling

==== Results by match ====
Match	1	2	3	4	5	6	7	8	9	10	11	12	13	14	15	16	17	18	19	20
Result	W	W	L	W	L	L	W	W	W	W	D	L	D	D	L	L	D	D	W	W
Position	1	3	5	4	4	6	5	4	3	3	3	3	4	4	5	5	5	5	4	4

Updated to match(es) played on 3 July 1955. Source: 2 Dear Points
W = Win; D = Draw; L = Loss

=== State Cup ===
26 March 1955 Round 3	Maccabi Rehovot	1–2	Beitar Tel Aviv	Rehovot
	Litvak 39'		18' Huli; 20' Elmaliah	Stadium: Maccabi Ground; Attendance: 1,000; Referee: Moshe Cohen

28 May 1955 Round 4	Hapoel Jaffa	1–2	Beitar Tel Aviv	Tel Aviv
	Kindel 26'		7' Elmaliah; 35' Huli	Stadium: Basa Stadium; Attendance: 3,500; Referee: M. Klein

=== Shapira Cup ===
==== League table ====
Pos	Team	Pld	W	D	L	GF	GA	GR	Pts
1	Hapoel Tel Aviv (W)	6	5	0	1	12	7	1.714	10
2	Maccabi Tel Aviv	6	4	0	2	16	8	2.000	8
3	Beitar Tel Aviv	6	2	0	4	7	8	0.875	4
4	Maccabi Jaffa	6	1	0	5	5	17	0.294	2

Source: Hadshot HaSport, p. 1
(W) Winners

==== Results ====
4 December 1954 1	Hapoel Tel Aviv	2–1	Beitar Tel Aviv	Tel Aviv
	Michaelov 18'; Yehudayoff 75'		26' Elmaliah	Stadium: Basa Stadium; Attendance: 7,000; Referee: Frisner

11 December 1954 2	Maccabi Tel Aviv	2–1	Beitar Tel Aviv	Tel Aviv
	Schneor 2'; Glazer 87'		67' Gleit	Stadium: Basa Stadium; Attendance: 6,500; Referee: Werner

18 December 1954 3	Beitar Tel Aviv	2–0	Maccabi Jaffa	Tel Aviv
	Huli 9', 79' (pen.)			Stadium: Basa Stadium; Attendance: 8,000; Referee: Zahavi

25 December 1954 4	Beitar Tel Aviv	1–2	Hapoel Tel Aviv	Tel Aviv
	Huli 55'		7' Rosenbaum; 72' (pen.) Balut	Stadium: Basa Stadium; Attendance: 6,000; Referee: Rosenbaum

8 January 1955 5	Beitar Tel Aviv	2–1 abandoned	Maccabi Tel Aviv	Tel Aviv
	Huli 40'; Bar-Zion 58'		38' Reznik	Stadium: Basa Stadium; Attendance: 4,000; Referee: Dudkevich

15 January 1955 6	Maccabi Jaffa	1–0	Beitar Tel Aviv	Tel Aviv
	M. Levi 1'			Stadium: Basa Stadium; Attendance: 4,000; Referee: Levichter
