= 1954–55 Maccabi Petah Tikva F.C. season =

Maccabi Petah Tikva
1954–55 season
- Manager: Eliezer Spiegel
- Stadium: Maccabi Ground, Petah Tikva
- Liga Alef: not completed
- State Cup: not completed
- Top goalscorer: League: Shalom Bernard; Amnon Carmeli (5); All: Eliezer Spiegel; Amnon Carmeli (6)

The 1954–55 Maccabi Petah Tikva season was the club's 44th season since its establishment in 1912, and 7th since the establishment of the State of Israel.

During the season, the club competed in Liga Alef (top division) and the State Cup. In addition, the team took part, along with Hapoel Petah Tikva, on a tour to Cyprus.

== Review and events ==
- On 24 September 1954 a team of players from both Hapoel Petah Tikva and Maccabi Petah Tikva departed for a tour of Cyprus, without the consent of the IFA. The Hapoel organization sent a telegram forbidding the participation of Hapoel players in any match, and the team played as Maccabi Petah Tikva.
  After returning to Israel, Maccabi Petah Tikva was banned for 6 months for its part of the tour, while Hapoel Petah Tikva received a fine of 50 pounds. As a result of the ban, the entire squad of the club was transferred to Maccabi Ein Ganim, which played several friendly matches until the ban was lifted as part of a general pardon given by the IFA in December and the club reverted to its name.
- On 10 January 1955, the IFA ordered to replay a match from the previous season between Maccabi Haifa and Maccabi Petah Tikva. The Original match, which was played on 26 December 1953 and ended with a 3–2 win for Haifa, was claimed to be fixed, to allow Maccabi Haifa to win. Maccabi Haifa won the rematch 4–1.
- Petah Tikva XI, a team composed of players from Hapoel Petah Tikva and Maccabi Petah Tikva played three matches against visiting foreign teams: Against Beşiktaş on 20 September 1954, losing 0–2, against Udarnik Sofia on 16 October 1954, losing 2–3, and against AC Omonia on 27 May 1955, winning 4–1.

== Match Results ==
=== Legend ===
Win Draw Loss

=== Liga Alef ===
League matches began on 6 February 1955, and by the time the season, only 20 rounds of matches were completed, delaying the end of the league season to the next season.

==== League table (as of 2 July 1955) ====
Pos	Club	P	W	D	L	GF	GA	GR	Pts
3	Hapoel Tel Aviv	20	9	8	3	37	17	2.18	26
4	Beitar Tel Aviv	20	9	5	6	48	36	1.33	23
5	Maccabi Petah Tikva	20	8	6	6	27	24	1.13	22
6	Maccabi Haifa	20	8	5	7	36	29	1.24	21
7	Maccabi Netanya	20	7	7	6	39	39	1.00	21

==== Matches ====
===== 1953–54 Liga Alef =====
15 January 1955	Maccabi Haifa	4–1	Maccabi Petah Tikva	Kfar Saba
	Held 1', 58'; Hardy 42', 65'	Report	17' Scharf	Stadium: Hapoel Ground; Attendance: 2,500; Referee: Aharon Werner

===== 1954–55 Liga Alef =====
5 February 1955 1	Maccabi Petah Tikva	0–1	Hapoel Petah Tikva	Petah Tikva
		Report (p. 8)	20' Stelmach	Stadium: Maccabi Ground; Attendance: 1,500; Referee: Sher

12 February 1955 2	Hapoel Hadera	2–0	Maccabi Petah Tikva	Hadera
	Halfon 72'; Weinberg 90'	Report (p. 8)		Stadium: Hapoel Ground; Attendance: 1,500; Referee: Dudkevich

19 February 1955 3	Maccabi Petah Tikva	2–1	Hapoel Balfouria	Petah Tikva
	Carmeli 9'; Scharf 58'		25' Tzur	Stadium: Maccabi Ground

26 February 1955 4	Maccabi Petah Tikva	3–0	Hapoel Haifa	Petah Tikva
	Bernard 38', 72'; Nadel 90'	Report (p. 8)		Stadium: Maccabi Ground; Attendance: 1,200; Referee: Frizner

5 March 1955 5	Maccabi Rehovot	1–0	Maccabi Petah Tikva	Rehovot
	Vider 28'	Report (p. 8)		Stadium: Maccabi Ground; Attendance: 1,500; Referee: G. Cohen

12 March 1955 6	Hapoel Tel Aviv	1–1	Maccabi Petah Tikva	Tel Aviv
	Yehudayoff 67'	Report (p. 8)	75' Bernard	Stadium: Basa Stadium; Attendance: 3,500; Referee: Ben-Rubi

19 March 1955 7	Maccabi Petah Tikva	2–0	Beitar Jerusalem	Petah Tikva
	Turkenitz 28' (pen.); Carmeli 54'	Report (p. 8)		Stadium: Maccabi Ground; Attendance: 1,700; Referee: Frizner

2 April 1955 8	Hapoel Kfar Saba	0–2	Maccabi Petah Tikva	Kfar Saba
			34' Scharf; 83' Ben Dror	Stadium: Hapoel Ground; Attendance: 2,000; Referee: Levichter

9 April 1955 9	Maccabi Petah Tikva	1–0	Hapoel Ramat Gan	Petah Tikva
	Turkenitz 67' (pen.)	Report (p. 8)		Stadium: Maccabi Ground; Attendance: 3,500; Referee: Cohen

13 April 1955 10	Maccabi Netanya	2–2	Maccabi Petah Tikva	Netanya
	H. Meller 55', 80'	Report (p. 4)	22' Spiegel; 40' Nadel	Stadium: Sar-Tov Stadium; Attendance: 2,000; Referee: Metzler

16 April 1955 11	Maccabi Tel Aviv	2–2	Maccabi Petah Tikva	Tel Aviv
	Dobrin 28'; Reznik 82' (pen.)	Report (p. 8)	30' (pen.) Spiegel; 48' Bernard	Stadium: Basa Stadium; Attendance: 8,000; Referee: Werner

23 April 1955 12	Maccabi Petah Tikva	4–2	Beitar Tel Aviv	Petah Tikva
	Spiegel 8'; Rabinson 24'; Turkenitz 63' (pen.); Carmeli 68'	Report (p. 8)	12' Bar-Zion; 17' HaMeiri	Stadium: Maccabi Ground; Attendance: 4,000; Referee: Parnas

30 April 1955 13	Maccabi Haifa	0–1	Maccabi Petah Tikva	Haifa
		Report	35' Carmeli	Stadium: Kiryat Haim Stadium; Attendance: 3,500; Referee: Dudkevich

14 May 1955 14	Hapoel Petah Tikva	1–1	Maccabi Petah Tikva	Petah Tikva
	Kofman 68'	Report (p. 8)	1' Carmeli	Stadium: Hapoel Ground; Attendance: 5,000; Referee: Frizner

21 May 1955 15	Maccabi Petah Tikva	1–1	Hapoel Hadera	Petah Tikva
	Ben Dror 37'	Report (p. 8)	27' Afgin	Stadium: Maccabi Ground; Attendance: 2,000; Referee: Fried

4 June 1955 16	Hapoel Balfouria	0–3	Maccabi Petah Tikva	Afula
		Report (p. 8)	14' Levkovich; 23' Schneidmesser; 40' Bernard	Stadium: Hapoel Ground; Attendance: 500; Referee: Cohen

11 June 1955 17	Hapoel Haifa	3–0 (w/o) (abandoned)	Maccabi Petah Tikva	Haifa
	Nestenfober 28'; Orbach 31'	Report (p. 8)		Stadium: Kiryat Haim Stadium; Attendance: 1,800; Referee: Werner

18 June 1955 18	Maccabi Petah Tikva	0–2	Maccabi Rehovot	Petah Tikva
		Report (p. 8)	2' Litvak; 19' Shrager	Stadium: Maccabi Ground; Attendance: 1,500; Referee: Scheindling

26 June 1955 19	Maccabi Petah Tikva	1–4	Hapoel Tel Aviv	Petah Tikva
	Spiegel 87'	Report (p. 8)	20', 35', 71' Michaelov; 55' Rosenbaum	Stadium: Maccabi Ground; Attendance: 2,000; Referee: Frizner

3 July 1955 20	Beitar Jerusalem	1–1	Maccabi Petah Tikva	Jerusalem
	Elfasi 85' (pen.)	Report (p. 8)	32' Bernard	Stadium: YMCA Stadium; Attendance: 7,000; Referee: Cohen

==== Results by match ====
Match	1	2	3	4	5	6	7	8	9	10	11	12	13	14	15	16	17	18	19	20
Result	L	L	W	W	L	D	W	W	W	D	D	W	W	D	D	W	L	L	L	D
Position	11	14	11	6	10	10	7	5	4	5	5	4	3	3	4	4	4	4	5	5

Updated to match(es) played on 3 July 1955. Source: 2 Dear Points
W = Win; D = Draw; L = Loss

=== State Cup ===
26 March 1955 Round 3	Maccabi Petah Tikva	3–2	Maccabi Shmuel Tel Aviv	Petah Tikva
	Schneidmesser 15'; Spiegel 68'; Turkenitz 90' (pen.)		Gitzi 27'; Mori 65'	Stadium: Maccabi Ground; Attendance: 500; Referee: Ashkenazi

28 May 1955 Round 4	Maccabi Petah Tikva	4–1	Hapoel Mahane Yehuda	Petah Tikva
	Spiegel 6'; Scharf 26', 59'; Carmeli 54'		20' Ben-David	Stadium: Maccabi Ground; Attendance: 500; Referee: Zahavi
