= 1999–2000 Toto Cup Al =

Toto Cup Al
- Season: 1999–2000
- Champions: Maccabi Petah Tikva (2nd title)

The 1999–2000 Toto Cup Al was the 16th season of the third-most important football tournament in Israel since its introduction. This was the first edition to be played with both Israeli Premier League and Liga Leumit clubs.

The competition began on 6 August 1999 and ended on 15 February 2000, with Maccabi Petah Tikva beating Maccabi Haifa 4–1 in the final.

== Format change ==
Starting with this edition, the competition was played as a knock-out tournament, with the first two rounds played over two legs, with ties from the quarter-finals and on were decided in a single match.

== Results ==
=== First round ===
| Team 1 | Agg. | Team 2 | 1st leg | 2nd leg |
|---|---|---|---|---|
| Bnei Yehuda | 7–3 | Hapoel Beit She'an | 4–3 | 3–0 |
| F.C. Ashdod | 7–4 | Maccabi Jaffa | 4–1 | 3–3 |
| Hakoah Ramat Gan | 1–4 | Maccabi Acre | 1–3 | 0–1 |
| Hapoel Be'er Sheva | 3–1 | Maccabi Kiryat Gat | 0–0 | 3–1 |
| Hapoel Jerusalem | 5–4 | Hapoel Tzafririm Holon | 2–2 | 3–2 |
| Maccabi Herzliya | 4–1 | Maccabi Ahi Nazareth | 3–1 | 1–0 |
| Maccabi Netanya | 6–0 | Beitar Be'er Sheva | 5–0 | 1–0 |
| Maccabi Petah Tikva | 7–1 | Hapoel Ashkelon | 5–0 | 2–1 |

=== Second round ===
| Team 1 | Agg. | Team 2 | 1st leg | 2nd leg |
|---|---|---|---|---|
| Ironi Rishon LeZion | (a) 1–1 | Hapoel Kfar Saba | 0–0 | 1–1 |
| Hapoel Tel Aviv | 0–4 | Maccabi Petah Tikva | 0–1 | 0–3 |
| Hapoel Haifa | 3–1 | Beitar Jerusalem | 1–1 | 2–1 |
| F.C. Ashdod | 4–1 | Hapoel Jerusalem | 3–1 | 1–0 |
| Hapoel Petah Tikva | 2–2 (a) | Maccabi Netanya | 1–2 | 1–0 |
| Maccabi Haifa | 5–2 | Maccabi Tel Aviv | 2–1 | 3–1 |
| Maccabi Acre | 5–3 | Maccabi Herzliya | 1–2 | 4–1 |
| Bnei Yehuda | 4–5 | Hapoel Be'er Sheva | 2–3 | 2–2 |

=== Quarter-finals ===
| 18 January 2000 | Maccabi Acre | 2–2 (a.e.t.) (5–6 p) | F.C. Ashdod |
| | Ayash 20'; Barkai 30' | | Almoshnino 84'; Nemec 90' |

| 18 January 2000 | Maccabi Netanya | 0–2 | Maccabi Haifa |
| | | | Jano 32' (pen.); Benayoun 66' |

| 20 January 2000 | Maccabi Petah Tikva | 2–0 | Hapoel Be'er Sheva |
| | Tubi 38'; Barakat 81' |

| 25 January 2000 | Hapoel Haifa | 1–3 | Ironi Rishon LeZion |
| | Tubi 76' | | Kabudi 51'; Márton 75'; Martziano 85' |

=== Semifinals ===
| 1 February 2000 | Maccabi Haifa | 3–0 | Ironi Rishon LeZion | Ramat Gan |
| 17:30 | Clescenco 26'; Ivanov 37'; Benayoun 44' | | | Stadium: Ramat Gan Stadium |

| 1 February 2000 | F.C. Ashdod | 0–2 | Maccabi Petah Tikva | Ramat Gan |
| 19:45 | | | Tubi 6'; Baransi 10' | Stadium: Ramat Gan Stadium |

=== Final ===
15 February 2000

| Maccabi Petah Tikva | 4–1 | Maccabi Haifa |
|---|---|---|
| Malichi 5', 42'; Amar 8'; Shmaryahu 58' | summary | Cohen 36' |

Ramat Gan Stadium
Attendance: 4,000
Referee: Eitan Tabrizi

== See also ==
- 1999–2000 Toto Cup Artzit
