= Eyal Almoshnino =

Israeli footballer

Eyal Almoshnino אייל אלמושנינו
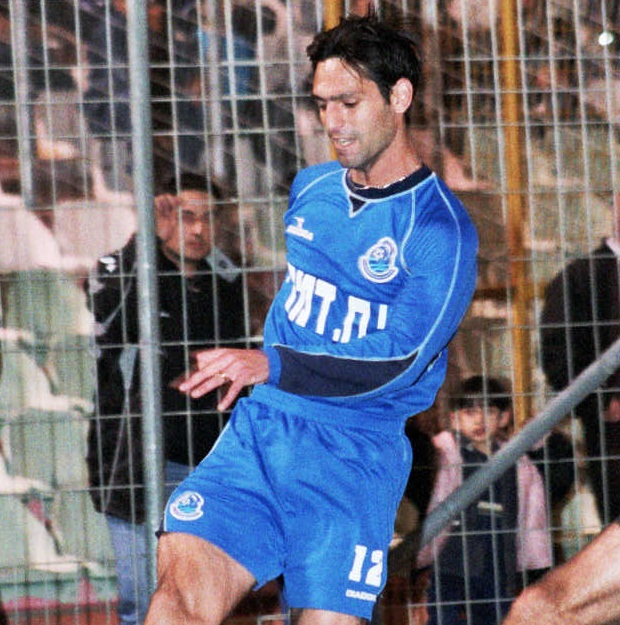

Personal information
- Date of birth: April 10, 1976 (age 50)
- Place of birth: Ashdod, Israel
- Height: 1.89 m (6 ft 2 in)
- Position: Defender

Youth career
- Ironi Ashdod

Senior career*
Years	Team	Apps	(Gls)
1993–1998	Ironi Ashdod	87	(4)
1998–2001	F.C. Ashdod	63	(4)
2001–2003	Maccabi Haifa	20	(2)
2003–2007	F.C. Ashdod	89	(1)
2008–2009	Hapoel Bnei Lod	35	(0)
2009	Maccabi Be'er Sheva	4	(0)
2010	Maccabi Kiryat Malakhi	11	(0)

International career
1994–1996	Israel U21	5	(0)
2000	Israel	1	(0)
- * Club domestic league appearances and goals

Eyal Almoshnino (Hebrew: אייל אלמושנינו; born April 10, 1976) is an Israeli footballer of a Tunisian-Jewish descent who played for Ironi Ashdod, F.C. Ashdod, Maccabi Haifa, Hapoel Bnei Lod, Maccabi Be'er Sheva and Maccabi Kiryat Malakhi. He was capped at under-21 level, and played once for the senior national team.

== Honours ==
- Israeli Second Division:
  - Runner-up (1): 1996-97
- Israeli Championships
  - Winner (1): 2001–02
- Toto Cup:
  - Runner-up (2): 2004–05, 2005–06
