= 1999–2000 Toto Cup Artzit =

Toto Cup Artzit
- Season: 1999–2000
- Champions: Hapoel Ramat Gan

The 1999–2000 Toto Cup Artzit was the 1st time the cup was being contested as a competition for the third tier in the Israeli football league system.

The competition was won by Hapoel Ramat Gan, who had beaten Hapoel Ra'anana 5–4 in the final.

== Competition format ==
As 1999–2000 Liga Artzit was composed of 12 teams, and as 4 teams, Hapoel Ashdod, Beitar Tel Aviv, Sektzia Nes Tziona and Hapoel Lod were not allowed to compete since their budget was not approved, the remaining 8 clubs played the competition as a straight knock-out tournament, with the quarter-finals being played over two legs.

== Results ==
=== Quarter-finals ===
Team 1	Agg.	Team 2	1st leg	2nd leg
Hapoel Ramat Gan	4–1	Maccabi Kafr Kanna	2–0	2–1
Hapoel Nazareth Illit	0–5	Maccabi Sha'arayim	0–4	0–1
Hapoel Dimona	2–5	Hapoel Ra'anana	2–1	0–4
Hapoel Tayibe	w/o	Hapoel Bat Yam	–	–

- Hapoel Tayibe was not allowed to play due to violation of arbitration judgement.

=== Semifinals ===
12 October 1999

Maccabi Sha'arayim	0–2	Hapoel Ramat Gan

12 October 1999

Hapoel Ra'anana	3–2 (a.e.t.)	Hapoel Bat Yam

=== Final ===
26 October 1999

Hapoel Ramat Gan	5–4 (a.e.t.)	Hapoel Ra'anana
Kaduri 39'; Maman 69', 77'; Brazilay 75'; Speler 95'		Kagan 5', 49'; Deri 48'; Toledano 63'

Herzliya Municipal Stadium

== See also ==
- Toto Cup
- 1999–2000 Liga Artzit
- 1999–2000 Toto Cup Al
