= Rajid Baransi =

Israeli former footballer

Rajid Baransi רג'יד בראנסי
Personal information
- Date of birth: 7 January 1979 (age 47)
- Place of birth: Nazareth, Israel
- Position: Striker

Youth career
- Maccabi Ahi Nazareth
- Maccabi Haifa

Senior career*
Years	Team	Apps	(Gls)
1997–1998	Maccabi Haifa	18	(2)
1998–2000	Maccabi Petah Tikva	45	(11)
2000–2001	Hapoel Be'er Sheva		(2)
2001–2002	Hapoel Beit She'an		(6)
2002–2003	Hapoel al-Ittihad Nazareth		
2003–2004	Hapoel Beit She'an		
2004–2006	Maccabi Kafr Kanna		
2006–2007	Maccabi Tirat HaCarmel	14	(3)
2007–2008	Maccabi Kafr Kanna	26	(8)
2008–2009	Ahva Arraba	20	(10)
2009–2010	Maccabi Kafr Kanna		
2010	Hapoel Kafr Kanna		
2010	Ihud Bnei Kafr Qara		
- * Club domestic league appearances and goals

Rajid Baransi (Arabic: راجد برانسي, Hebrew: רג'יד בראנסי; born 7 January 1979) is an Israeli former footballer. A product of the youth system of Maccabi Ahi Nazareth, he was sought after by Hapoel and Maccabi Haifa but his motherclub preferred to sell him to Maccabi. Having trouble finding the net, during a match against Bnei Yehuda, Alon Mizrahi let him take a penalty kick so he could finally score his first goal in a professional match. With the arrival of Dušan Uhrin to the club, Baransi was released as Uhrin signed Maccabi Netanya's Liron Vilner and he promoted Yaniv Katan from the youth team.
