= 2002–03 Toto Cup Artzit =

Toto Cup Artzit
- Season: 2002–03
- Champions: Hapoel Ashkelon (2nd Title)

The 2002–03 Toto Cup Artzit was the 4th time the cup was being contested as a competition for the third tier in the Israeli football league system.

The competition was won, for the second consecutive time, by Hapoel Ashkelon, who had beaten Hapoel Majd al-Krum 2–1 in the final with a golden goal during extra time.

== Format change ==
The 12 Liga Artzit clubs were divided into two groups, each with six clubs, with the top two teams advancing to the quarter-finals.

== Group stage ==
=== Group A ===
Pos	Team	Pld	W	D	L	GF	GA	GD	Pts	IKS	HAS	HBY	HBN	BST	MRA
1	Ironi Kiryat Shmona (A)	10	4	4	2	19	17	+2	16	—	0–0	3–3	1–1	2–3	1–0
2	Hapoel Ashkelon (A)	10	4	4	2	9	8	+1	16	2–4	—	1–0	1–0	1–0	2–2
3	Hapoel Bat Yam	10	2	7	1	11	8	+3	13	3–0	0–0	—	0–0	1–1	1–0
4	Hapoel Beit She'an	10	3	4	3	14	16	−2	13	2–2	1–0	1–1	—	4–3	3–2
5	Beitar Shimshon Tel Aviv	10	3	2	5	15	15	0	11	2–3	0–1	1–1	2–0	—	2–0
6	Maccabi Ramat Amidar	10	2	3	5	13	17	−4	9	1–3	1–1	1–1	4–2	2–1	—

Source: rsssf.com (in Hebrew)
Rules for classification: 1st points; 2nd goal difference; 3rd matches won; 4th goals scored; 5th head-to-head; 6th decision match
(A) Advanced to the Semifinals

=== Group B ===
On 29 August 2002 Hakoah Ramat Gan was demoted to Liga Artzit and was replaced by Hapoel Tzafririm Holon. As a result, the two matches played by Hapoel Tzafririm Holon before the club was promoted were annulled.

Pos	Team	Pld	W	D	L	GF	GA	GD	Pts	HAC	HMJ	HRH	IKA	HMR	HSU
1	Hapoel Acre (A)	10	5	4	1	20	11	+9	19	—	1–1	1–1	1–3	2–1	6–1
2	Ihud Bnei Majd al-Krum (A)	10	5	4	1	16	10	+6	19	1–3	—	2–1	2–2	2–1	2–2
3	Hapoel Ramat HaSharon	10	4	3	3	16	17	−1	15	0–2	0–2	—	3–2	4–3	1–1
4	Maccabi Kiryat Ata	10	2	6	2	24	17	+7	12	2–2	0–0	2–2	—	1–1	8–1
5	Hakoah Amidar Ramat Gan	10	2	2	6	15	22	−7	8	1–1	0–3	1–2	4–3	—	3–1
6	Hapoel Ihud Bnei Sumei	10	1	3	6	11	25	−14	6	0–1	0–1	1–2	1–1	3–0	—

Source: rsssf.com (in Hebrew)
Rules for classification: 1st points; 2nd goal difference; 3rd matches won; 4th goals scored; 5th head-to-head; 6th decision match
(A) Advanced to the Semifinals

== Knockout rounds ==
=== Semifinals ===
Home team	Score	Away team
Ironi Kiryat Shmona	0–0 (a.e.t.) (3–4 p)	Hapoel Ashkelon
Hapoel Acre	0–1	Hapoel Majd al-Krum

=== Final ===
25 March 2003

Hapoel Ashkelon	2–1 (a.e.t.)	Hapoel Majd al-Krum
Elkayam 4'; Taher 106' (o.g.)	Report	Saba'a 35'

Herzliya Municipal Stadium

== See also ==
- 2002–03 Toto Cup Al
