= 1955–56 Liga Leumit =

Liga Leumit
- Season: 1955-56
- Champions: Maccabi Tel Aviv; 8th title
- Relegated: Hapoel Kfar Saba; Maccabi Rehovot
- Matches played: 132
- Goals scored: 465 (3.52 per match)
- Top goalscorer: Avraham "Huli" Levi; Michael Michaelov (15)

The 1955–56 Liga Leumit season was the first edition of Liga Leumit, which had replaced Liga Alef as the top division of football in Israel and the 17th season of top flight football under the IFA.

Maccabi Tel Aviv won the title. Avraham Levi from Beitar Tel Aviv and Michael Michaelov from Hapoel Tel Aviv were the league's joint top scorers with 16 goals each.

Hapoel Kfar Saba and Maccabi Rehovot were relegated automatically, whilst Maccabi Jaffa finished third from bottom and entered a promotion/relegation play-off with Liga Alef champions Hakoah Tel Aviv. Jaffa won 4-1 on aggregate and remained in Liga Leumit.

== Teams ==
Team	Home city	Home ground
Beitar Tel Aviv	Tel Aviv	Basa Stadium
Hapoel Haifa	Haifa	Kiryat Eliezer Stadium
Hapoel Kfar Saba	Kfar Saba	Hapoel Ground, Kfar Saba
Hapoel Petah Tikva	Petah Tikva	Hapoel Ground, Petah Tikva
Hapoel Ramat Gan	Ramat Gan	HaMakhtesh Stadium
Hapoel Tel Aviv	Tel Aviv	Basa Stadium
Maccabi Haifa	Haifa	Kiryat Eliezer Stadium
Maccabi Jaffa	Tel Aviv	Maccabi Jaffa Ground
Maccabi Netanya	Netanya	Sar-Tov Stadium
Maccabi Petah Tikva	Petah Tikva	Maccabi Ground, Petah Tikva
Maccabi Rehovot	Rehovot	Maccabi Ground, Rehovot
Maccabi Tel Aviv	Tel Aviv	Basa Stadium

== Final table ==
Pos	Team	Pld	W	D	L	GF	GA	GR	Pts	Qualification or relegation
1	Maccabi Tel Aviv	22	13	6	3	47	16	2.938	32	Champions
2	Hapoel Petah Tikva	22	12	5	5	54	28	1.929	29	
3	Hapoel Tel Aviv	22	12	5	5	49	29	1.690	29	
4	Maccabi Petah Tikva	22	10	7	5	43	34	1.265	27	
5	Maccabi Haifa	22	11	3	8	53	27	1.963	25	
6	Hapoel Haifa	22	9	4	9	32	39	0.821	22	
7	Beitar Tel Aviv	22	10	0	12	41	48	0.854	20	
8	Maccabi Netanya	22	9	2	11	31	44	0.705	20	
9	Hapoel Ramat Gan	22	9	0	13	28	42	0.667	18	
10	Maccabi Jaffa	22	6	5	11	39	44	0.886	17	Relegation Playoffs
11	Maccabi Rehovot	22	6	1	15	25	62	0.403	13	Relegated to Liga Alef
12	Hapoel Kfar Saba	22	3	6	13	20	48	0.417	12	Relegated to Liga Alef

Source: Davar (in Hebrew)
Rules for classification: 1) points; 2) goal ratio 3) goals scored.

== Results ==
Home \ Away	BTA	HHA	HKS	HPT	HRG	HTA	MHA	MJA	MNE	MPT	MRV	MTA
Beitar Tel Aviv	—	2–3	0–3	1–2	1–0	0–5	1–6	4–0	2–0	2–3	6–3	1–2
Hapoel Haifa	1–3	—	3–0	1–0	2–3	2–2	0–0	3–1	3–2	3–2	3–0	0–3
Hapoel Kfar Saba	2–0	0–1	—	2–1	1–2	1–5	1–4	0–0	0–2	1–1	0–0	0–1
Hapoel Petah Tikva	2–0	2–2	4–0	—	3–0	1–2	1–3	4–2	6–0	3–1	3–0	1–1
Hapoel Ramat Gan	0–3	1–0	3–1	2–5	—	0–1	0–1	2–5	4–2	0–3	3–2	1–0
Hapoel Tel Aviv	3–1	5–1	0–0	1–0	2–0	—	0–2	0–1	2–0	2–0	7–1	3–0
Maccabi Haifa	4–2	5–0	1–2	1–2	3–0	2–2	—	5–1	0–2	1–3	5–0	1–3
Maccabi Jaffa	2–4	1–2	4–1	3–3	2–1	2–2	3–2	—	2–3	1–1	6–1	0–2
Maccabi Netanya	1–0	3–1	3–3	1–3	0–3	1–2	3–1	2–0	—	0–0	2–1	2–1
Maccabi Petah Tikva	0–3	1–1	7–1	4–4	3–1	4–4	2–0	2–0	4–1	—	1–0	3–3
Maccabi Rehovot	1–0	1–0	3–2	0–3	1–2	3–2	0–3	3–1	3–1	1–2	—	0–7
Maccabi Tel Aviv	2–3	2–0	0–0	1–1	1–0	3–0	1–1	1–1	3–0	2–0	5–1	—

Source: Davar (in Hebrew)
Legend: Blue = home team win; Yellow = draw; Red = away team win.

== Positions by round ==
The table lists the positions of teams after each week of matches. In order to preserve chronological evolvements, any postponed matches are not included to the round at which they were originally scheduled, but added to the full round they were played immediately afterwards. For example, if a match is scheduled for matchday 13, but then postponed and played between days 16 and 17, it will be added to the standings for day 17.

Team ╲ Round	1	2	3	4	5	6	7	8	9	10	11	12	13	14	15	16	17	18	19	20	21	22
Maccabi Tel Aviv	5	6	6	5	4	5	7	6	6	4	3	1	2	2	3	3	3	3	2	1	1	1
Hapoel Petah Tikva	3	4	2	3	2	1	1	2	2	3	2	4	4	3	2	1	1	1	3	4	3	2
Hapoel Tel Aviv	1	1	1	1	3	3	3	3	3	2	4	3	1	1	1	2	2	2	1	2	2	3
Maccabi Petah Tikva	5	3	3	2	1	2	2	1	1	1	1	2	3	4	4	4	4	5	4	3	4	4
Maccabi Haifa	10	5	7	6	5	6	4	4	5	6	5	5	6	5	5	5	5	4	5	5	5	5
Hapoel Haifa	3	8	8	9	7	7	5	7	7	7	7	6	5	6	7	7	6	6	6	6	6	6
Beitar Tel Aviv	2	2	4	4	6	4	6	5	4	5	6	7	7	7	6	6	7	7	7	7	8	7
Maccabi Netanya	5	9	10	10	12	12	10	8	9	8	8	8	8	8	8	8	8	8	8	8	7	8
Hapoel Ramat Gan	12	7	5	7	8	9	11	12	10	9	10	11	9	9	9	9	9	9	9	9	9	9
Maccabi Jaffa	10	12	12	12	11	10	8	9	8	11	9	10	10	10	10	11	11	11	11	10	10	10
Maccabi Rehovot	9	11	9	8	9	8	9	10	12	10	11	9	11	11	11	10	10	10	10	11	11	11
Hapoel Kfar Saba	5	10	11	11	10	11	12	11	11	12	12	12	12	12	12	12	12	12	12	12	12	12

== Top goalscorers ==
Pos	Player	Club	Goals
1	Avraham "Huli" Levi	Beitar Tel Aviv	15
1	Michael Michaelov	Hapoel Tel Aviv	15
3	Baruch Cohen	Maccabi Jaffa	14
3	Boaz Kofman	Hapoel Petah Tikva	14
3	Shlomo Levi	Maccabi Haifa	14
6	Nahum Stelmach	Hapoel Petah Tikva	13
6	Eliezer Spiegel	Maccabi Petah Tikva	13
8	Itzhak Kirschenberg	Hapoel Ramat Gan	11
10	Rehavia Rosenbaum	Hapoel Tel Aviv	10
10	Jonny Hardy	Maccabi Haifa	10
10	Boghos Ghougasian	Maccabi Jaffa	10
