= 1942 Palestine Cup =

Tournament details
- Country: Mandatory Palestine

Final positions
- Champions: Beitar Tel Aviv (2nd title)
- Runners-up: Maccabi Haifa

The 1942 Palestine Cup (Hebrew: הגביע הארץ-ישראלי, HaGavia HaEretz-Israeli) was the thirteenth season of the Israeli Football Association's nationwide football cup competition.

This edition of the competition is notorious for two debacles, which led to the qualification of Maccabi Haifa to the finals. The first, a set of appeals on the first round tie between Hapoel Petah Tikva and Maccabi Haifa, which delayed the competition for nearly two months until a final decision, which was given through arbitration.

The second was caused by a controversial decision by the EIFA regarding the quarter-final tie between Maccabi Tel Aviv and Arab team Shabab al-Arab from Haifa. The match between the two ended with a Maccabi win of 7–4 (a.e.t.). However, the Haifa club appealed against the result, as Maccabi fielded four ineligible players, due to their age and their applicability to army service. The EIFA decided to confirm the tie's result, but to exclude Maccabi from the rest of the competition, instead of awarding the tie to Shabab al-Arab. The ensuing turmoil among the Arab clubs was among the things that led to the re-establishment of the APSF.

As Maccabi Haifa was due to meet Maccabi Tel Aviv at the semi-finals, it advanced to the final, where it was defeated by a record score line of 12–1 by Beitar Tel Aviv.

== Results ==
=== First round ===
Matches were played on 14 February 1942.

Home team	Score	Away team
Beitar Tel Aviv	5–1	Islamic Haifa
Maccabi Nes Tziona	4–1	Hapoel Tel Aviv
Maccabi Tel Aviv	2–2 (a.e.t.)	Hapoel Jerusalem
Maccabi Avshalom Petah Tikva	w/o	Maccabi Jerusalem
Hapoel Petah Tikva	0–0 (a.e.t.)	Maccabi Haifa
Maccabi Netanya	4–1	Hapoel Hadera
Hapoel Rehovot	4–6	Royal Hellenic
Barker's XI	4–0	Beitar Netanya
Maccabi Rishon LeZion	4–1	Bnei Yehuda
Hapoel Haifa	5–2 (Note: The match was abandoned at the 80th minute after a Tarsana player, Jamil Bakir refused to leave the field after being sent off and the result stood.)	Tarsana
Mander's Army XI	3–1	Imperial Haifa

==== Replays ====
Home team	Score	Away team
Hapoel Petah Tikva	2–3 (a.e.t.) (Note: After the match Hapoel Petah Tikva appealed, claiming the referee had ejected a Maccabi Haifa player during regular time, and then allowed him to return to the match for the extra time. The EIFA ordered the teams to play a third match, scheduled for 25 April 1942. As Maccabi Haifa failed to show to the replay, Hapoel Petah Tikva was given a walkover win. Maccabi Haifa then appealed against both the walkover loss and the decision to play a third match, and through arbitration, their appeals were upheld, and was returned to the competition at the quarter-finals stage.)	Maccabi Haifa
Hapoel Jerusalem	1–2	Maccabi Tel Aviv

=== Second round ===
Home team	Score	Away team
National Sport Club Jaffa	1–2	Maccabi Rishon LeZion
Beitar Tel Aviv	3–0	Maccabi Avshalom Petah Tikva
Christian Club Jerusalem	0–1 (Note: After Maccabi Haifa have triumphed over Hapoel Petah Tikva in the earlier round, a match was held on 14 March 1942 in which Maccabi Haifa won 1–0. Following Hapoel Petah Tikva's appeal and walkover win over Maccabi Haifa, a match was played on 2 May 1942 between Christian Club and Hapoel Petah Tikva, which had won the match 1–2. After Maccabi Haifa was reinstated into the competition, the original result was restored as well.)	Maccabi Haifa
Barker's XI	0–4	Maccabi Netanya
Mander's Army XI	1–3	Shabab al-Arab Haifa
R.A.P.C. Jerusalem	0–3	Maccabi Nes Tziona
Royal Hellenic	2–1	Hapoel Ramat Gan
Hapoel Haifa	1–3	Maccabi Tel Aviv

=== Quarter-finals ===
Home team	Score	Away team
Beitar Tel Aviv	1–0	Maccabi Nes Tziona
Maccabi Tel Aviv	7–4 (a.e.t.)	Shabab al-Arab Haifa
Maccabi Netanya	1–4	Maccabi Rishon LeZion
Maccabi Haifa	w/o (Note: Initially, the match was supposed to be held on 11 April 1942, and since Maccabi Haifa was suspended from play, pending Hapoel Petah Tikva's appeal, Royal Hellenic was given a walkover win. After the conclusion of the appeals, the match was rescheduled to 06 June 1942, by which time the Greek team had already left Palestine, and Maccabi Haifa was given a walkover win.)	Royal Hellenic

=== Semi-finals ===
Home team	Score	Away team
Beitar Tel Aviv	4–1	Maccabi Rishon LeZion
Maccabi Tel Aviv	w/o (Note: Maccabi Tel Aviv was thrown out of the competition after fielding four ineligible players in the quarter final match against Shabab al-Arab Haifa.)	Maccabi Haifa

=== Final ===
4 July 1942

Beitar Tel Aviv	12–1	Maccabi Haifa
Spiegel; Wermes; Bogdanov; Schneor; Shraga Grinwald; Dvorin 89' (pen.)		Steinhart 40'

Maccabiah Stadium, Tel Aviv
Attendance: 3000
Referee: Yon
