= 1953–54 Liga Alef =

Liga Alef
- Season: 1953-54
- Champions: Maccabi Tel Aviv; 7th title
- Matches played: 133
- Goals scored: 405 (3.05 per match)
- Top goalscorer: Eliezer Spiegel (16)

The 1953–54 Liga Alef season saw Maccabi Tel Aviv were crowned champions for the third successive time, whilst Eliezer Spiegel of Maccabi Petah Tikva was the league's top scorer with 16 goals. No clubs were relegated as the league was expanded to 14 clubs in the following season.

Although league matches ended on 13 March 1954, the confirmation of the league's final standings was delayed, as a match between Maccabi Haifa and Maccabi Petah Tikva, which was played on 26 December 1953 and ended with a 3–2 win for Haifa, was claimed to be fixed, to allow Maccabi Haifa to win. Eventually, on 10 January 1955, the IFA decided to replay the match in a neutral venue, Maccabi Haifa won the rematch 4–1 and secured their spot in the top division. However, with the IFA already deadlocked with an ongoing dispute between Hapoel and Maccabi, Beitar declared its resignation from the IFA in protest of the IFA decision to replay the Maccabi Haifa-Maccabi Petah Tikva match. Discussions were held with the help of Judge Yosef-Michael Lamm, and an agreement between the factions was reached on 28 January 1955, confirming the results of the season and reprieving Beitar Tel Aviv and Hapoel Balfouria from relegation.

The league was played with two points for a win and one for a draw.

== Final table ==
| Pos | Team | Pld | W | D | L | GF | GA | GR | Pts |
|---|---|---|---|---|---|---|---|---|---|
| 1 | Maccabi Tel Aviv (C) | 22 | 16 | 6 | 0 | 59 | 11 | 5.364 | 38 |
| 2 | Maccabi Petah Tikva | 22 | 13 | 6 | 3 | 50 | 22 | 2.273 | 32 |
| 3 | Hapoel Petah Tikva | 22 | 12 | 3 | 7 | 55 | 25 | 2.200 | 27 |
| 4 | Hapoel Tel Aviv | 22 | 9 | 7 | 6 | 35 | 18 | 1.944 | 25 |
| 5 | Maccabi Rehovot | 22 | 6 | 9 | 7 | 30 | 33 | 0.909 | 21 |
| 6 | Hapoel Ramat Gan | 22 | 8 | 4 | 10 | 31 | 35 | 0.886 | 20 |
| 7 | Maccabi Netanya | 22 | 7 | 5 | 10 | 23 | 36 | 0.639 | 19 |
| 8 | Maccabi Haifa | 22 | 8 | 3 | 11 | 26 | 51 | 0.510 | 19 |
| 9 | Hapoel Haifa | 22 | 7 | 4 | 11 | 26 | 37 | 0.703 | 18 |
| 10 | Hapoel Kfar Saba | 22 | 8 | 1 | 13 | 27 | 38 | 0.711 | 17 |
| 11 | Beitar Tel Aviv | 22 | 7 | 3 | 12 | 23 | 42 | 0.548 | 17 |
| 12 | Hapoel Balfouria | 22 | 4 | 3 | 15 | 20 | 57 | 0.351 | 11 |

Source: 100 Years of Football 1906-2006, Elisha Shohat (Israel), 2006
(C) Champions

== Results ==
| Home \ Away | BTA | BLF | HHA | HKS | HPT | HRG | HTA | MHA | MNE | MPT | MRV | MTA |
|---|---|---|---|---|---|---|---|---|---|---|---|---|
| Beitar Tel Aviv | — | 1–2 | 2–1 | 0–1 | 0–2 | 3–1 | 1–0 | 4–0 | 0–0 | 2–1 | 1–0 | 0–6 |
| Hapoel Balfouria | 1–3 | — | 0–3 | 1–0 | 0–0 | 3–2 | 1–1 | 1–2 | 1–3 | 2–4 | 1–2 | 0–6 |
| Hapoel Haifa | 2–2 | 0–1 | — | 3–0 | 1–2 | 3–1 | 2–1 | 1–0 | 0–0 | 1–1 | 1–3 | 1–3 |
| Hapoel Kfar Saba | 3–1 | 4–3 | 0–1 | — | 1–2 | 1–0 | 0–2 | 4–1 | 2–0 | 1–2 | 1–1 | 1–5 |
| Hapoel Petah Tikva | 6–0 | 4–0 | 7–0 | 3–1 | — | 1–2 | 1–0 | 9–0 | 4–1 | 1–1 | 2–2 | 2–3 |
| Hapoel Ramat Gan | 4–0 | 4–0 | 2–0 | 3–1 | 2–3 | — | 0–2 | 4–0 | 0–0 | 1–2 | 3–2 | 1–1 |
| Hapoel Tel Aviv | 3–0 | 1–1 | 3–2 | 0–1 | 2–0 | 8–0 | — | 2–0 | 4–0 | 0–1 | 1–1 | 0–3 |
| Maccabi Haifa | 3–1 | 4–1 | 1–0 | 2–1 | 2–1 | 0–1 | 1–1 | — | 2–1 | 4–1 (Note: The match was originally ended with Maccabi Haifa winning 3–2. Due to claims of alleged match fixing the match was replayed.) | 3–5 | 0–0 |
| Maccabi Netanya | 1–0 | 2–0 | 1–2 | 2–1 | 1–3 | 1–0 | 0–1 | 4–0 | — | 0–2 | 2–2 | 1–1 |
| Maccabi Petah Tikva | 1–1 | 5–1 | 2–0 | 4–1 | 2–1 | 4–0 | 1–1 | 3–0 | 7–1 | — | 5–2 | 0–0 |
| Maccabi Rehovot | 2–1 | 3–0 | 2–2 | 0–1 | 2–0 | 0–0 | 0–0 | 1–1 | 0–2 | 0–0 | — | 0–3 |
| Maccabi Tel Aviv | 2–0 | 3–0 | 3–0 | 2–1 | 2–1 | 0–0 | 2–2 | 5–0 | 4–0 | 2–1 | 3–0 | — |

Source: 100 Years of Football 1906-2006, Elisha Shohat (Israel), 2006
Legend: Blue = home team win; Red = away team win.
