= Baruch Cohen =

Israeli intelligence officer (1936–1973)

- ברוך כהן
- Born: 17 January 1936; Haifa, Mandatory Palestine
- Died: 23 January 1973 (aged 37); Madrid, Spain
- Burial place: Military cemetery, Haifa, Israel
- Spouse: Nurit Cohen
- Children: 4
- Relatives: Chaim Cohen (father), Victoria Cohen (mother)
- Military career
- Allegiance: Israel
- Branch: Israel Defense Forces
- Service years: 1953–1973
- Conflicts: 1956 Suez Crisis
- Other work: Shin Bet; Mossad

Baruch Cohen (Hebrew: ברוך כהן; 17 January 1936 – 23 January 1973) was an Israeli intelligence officer in the Shin Bet and katsa in the Mossad. Cohen was assassinated by the Palestinian militant group Black September Organization in Madrid in 1973 after meeting with one of his Palestinian informants, who was a double agent.

== Early life ==
Baruch Cohen was born on 17 January 1936, in Haifa, then in Mandatory Palestine. The Cohen family had lived in Haifa for five generations. Cohen was the son of Chaim and Victoria and had 5 brothers. Three of his brothers were members of the Hagana and had been arrested and imprisoned by the British Army. One brother was killed in the Battle of Rafah during the 1948 Arab-Israeli War.

Baruch spoke Arabic with his parents and felt at ease in an Arab home. At the age of 16, he joined Kibbutz Ein Harod, and then the Nahal in 1953, where he completed officers and combat sergeants courses.

== Government career ==
Cohen completed his mandatory service in the Israel Defense Forces (IDF) in 1958, then joined the Shin Bet security service as a case officer in 1959. Due to his Arabic skills, Cohen worked in Nablus and the surrounding refugee camps, trying to recruit Palestinians to spy for Israel. He was reportedly quite adept and became a station chief.

Between 1963 and 1964, Cohen left Shin Bet to work for the Jewish Agency as director of the Galilee region. He returned to government service in 1964.

At Shin Bet, Cohen led the investigation that uncovered a Syrian-directed Jewish-Arab spy ring in Israel. Cohen interrogated the spy ring's alleged leader in Israel, Daud Turki, a Palestinian-Israel anti-Zionist politician. Cohen's role was revealed 2 months after his death, when Turki's statements and confession during his interrogation were read during the trial in March 1973 of Turki and five co-defendants.

By the early 1970s, there were an estimated 6,000 Palestinians in West Germany, many of whom students who were involved in Palestinian militant groups like Fatah and the Black September Organization. In 1970, Cohen's charisma and deep knowledge of Palestinians led to the Tzomet Division of the Mossad to request his secondment as director of Mossad's operations in Europe. Cohen moved with his wife and four children to Brussels, and from July 1970 to December 1972, he worked at the Israel embassy in Brussels, after which he returned to Israel.

== Assassination ==
On the morning of Tuesday, 23 January 1973, Cohen met one of his informants, a Palestinian medical student and Fatah activist living in Seville named Samir Mayed Ahmed, at Café Morrison on Calle Jose Antonio, later renamed the Gran Vía. As their meeting on 23 January ended, two men came up to Cohen and shot him three times in the chest. A fourth bullet hit a passerby. Cohen later died at the Francisco Franco hospital.

Cohen had met Samir several times to discuss Palestinian political activities, but Samir was actually a double agent for the Palestinian militant group Black September Organization.

Initial news reports originally identified Cohen as a tourist named Moshe Hannan Yishai, the name on the passport of his undercover identity. After his body had been flown back to Israel for burial, Israeli authorities revealed his true name and government affiliation.

=== Aftermath ===
Later that day, Black September Organization issued a public claim of responsibility for the assassination, alleging that Cohen, whom they incorrectly identified as Uri Molov, had been shadowing Arab intelligence officers. While some in the media believed the operation was retaliation for Israel's Operation Wrath of God, Cohen's assassination was planned months in advance.

More than 10 years later, Mossad reportedly found Samir in Tunis; however, the Mossad director did not authorize his assassination, purportedly for fear of losing another Mossad officer.

== Personal ==
Cohen met his wife Nurit when they were both instructors in the Nahal. They married in 1956 and lived in Re'im near the Gaza Strip. The couple had four children. Cohen is buried in the military cemetery in Haifa.

== See also ==
- Operation Wrath of God
