= Nisim Elmaliah =

Israeli footballer

Nisim Elmaliah ניסים אלמליח
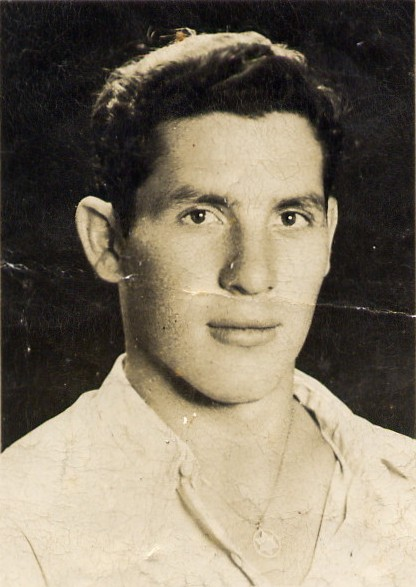

Personal information
- Full name: Nisim Elmaliah
- Place of birth: Jerusalem, Israel

Youth career
- Beitar Tel Aviv

Senior career*
Years	Team	Apps	(Gls)
1948–1959	Beitar Tel Aviv	109	(69)
1959–1960	Beitar Jerusalem	19	(9)
1960–1961	Beitar Ramla	12	(1)
1961–1962	Beitar Tel Aviv	9	(1)
Total		149	(80)

International career
1950	Israel	2	(0)

Managerial career
- 1962: Beitar Ramla
- 1963: Beitar Holon
- 1964: Beitar Haifa
- 1965: Beitar Kiryat Shmona
- * Club domestic league appearances and goals

Nisim Elmaliah (Hebrew: ניסים אלמליח; November 11, 1928 – October 24, 1989) was an Israeli footballer who played mainly in the uniform of Beitar Tel Aviv. Elmaliah was known to have particularly strong kick, which helped him to score many goals. Among his achievements, he won the award of the top scorer in the 1954–55 season after scoring 30 goals in 26 games for Beitar Tel Aviv, a record that held until April 11, 2016, when Eran Zahavi broke it.

Elmaliah is remembered by a beret that he put on his head at the beginning of his professional career, a relic of his religious and observant. There is also known case in which during a league game he dropped his beret on the opponent's goal. Elmaliah dribbled back, put again the beret and continued to attack his opponents without disturbing the game.

Elmaliah ability as an outstanding offensive footballer brought teams from all over Israel to pursue him and try to convince him to play their dimensions. For example, he was invited to strengthen Maccabi Tel Aviv squad during a long journey of games in Yugoslavia. Maccabi Petah Tikva also offered him a share of Egged if he would play in its ranks but Elmaliah remained loyal to Beitar Tel Aviv. Elmaliah also had two appearances for Israel's national team. He died at the age of 61.
