= Gaon Stadium =

Former football stadium in Tel Aviv, Israel

Gaon Stadium אצטדיון גאון
- Interactive map of Gaon Stadium אצטדיון גאון
- Location: 8 Nes LaGoyim Street, Tel Aviv
- Coordinates: 32°2′37.5″N 34°45′41.5″E
- Capacity: 4,000
- Surface: Grass

Construction
- Opened: 1951 (as Maccabi Jaffa Ground); 1977 (as Gaon Stadium)
- Closed: 2007
- Demolished: 1971; 2009

Tenants
- Maccabi Jaffa (1951–2000); Beitar Tel Aviv (1979-1980); Shimshon Tel Aviv (1980-1981, 1982-1983, 1984-1985); A.S. Ramat Eliyahu (2000–2008)

Gaon Stadium (Hebrew: אצטדיון גאון) was a football stadium in Tel Aviv part of Jaffa, home of former club Maccabi Jaffa.

== History ==
Members of Maccabi Jaffa built a ground for the club at the location in 1951, after receiving some agricultural land on the outskirts of Jaffa, which belonged to the Dajani family and was abandoned during the 1947–1949 Palestine war. The club used the ground until it became unsuited for the club matches, forcing Maccabi Jaffa to move temporarily to play in other nearby stadiums. In 1971 the old ground was demolished and a new stadium was built, opening in 1977. The ground was named after Nessim Gaon and his wife Renée, who helped financially with the construction of the stadium.

Maccabi Jaffa played in the ground until 2000, when the club was dissolved due to heavy debts. The club was merged with A.S. Ramat Eliyahu, which took over the stadium, until it was forced to merge with another local club, Hapoel Ihud Bnei Jaffa due to financial problems, and the merged club, under the name F.C. Bnei Jaffa, continued to play in Bnei Jaffa's ground.

In April 2008 an agreement was reached between the Tel Aviv municipality and the Liquidator of Maccabi Jaffa on the purchase of the stadium for the sum of 5.5 million NIS. The ground was abandoned and was finally demolished in 2009. In its place currently stands a public garden.
