= Amnon Carmeli =

Israeli footballer

Amnon Carmeli אמנון כרמלי
Personal information
- Date of birth: 22 August 1929
- Place of birth: Petah Tikva, Mandatory Palestine
- Date of death: 4 December 1993 (aged 64)
- Position: Striker

Youth career
- 1946–1949: Maccabi Petah Tikva

Senior career*
Years	Team	Apps	(Gls)
1949–1960	Maccabi Petah Tikva		(32)

International career
1954	Israel	1	(0)
- * Club domestic league appearances and goals

Amnon Carmeli (Hebrew: אמנון כרמלי; born 22 August 1929, died 4 December 1993) was a former Israeli footballer who played for Maccabi Petah Tikva, scoring the club's winning goal in the 1952 State Cup final. Carmeli also played one match for the Israel national football team, against Yugoslavia national football team, in 1954.

After retirement, in 1960, Carmeli stayed close to Maccabi Petah Tikva, becoming a board member in 1969. Carmeli also served as the club's chairmen.

== Honours ==
- Israel State Cup (1):
  - 1951–52
