= Maccabi Ground, Petah Tikva =

Defunct football stadium in Petah Tikva, Israel

- Interactive map of Maccabi Ground, Petah Tikva
- Full name: Maccabi Sports Ground, Petah Tikva
- Location: Petah Tikva, Israel
- Coordinates: 32°5′38.6″N 34°53′23.4″E

Construction
- Opened: 1926
- Closed: 1975

Tenant
- Maccabi Petah Tikva (1926–1975)

Maccabi Ground, Petah Tikva (Hebrew: מגרש מכבי פתח תקווה) was a football stadium in Petah Tikva, on Stampfer street. The ground was in use between 1926 and 1975 and was abandoned when the lot was given to the Petah Tikva municipality and was built over.

== See also ==
- List of football stadiums in Israel
