= Eliezer Spiegel =

Israeli footballer and manager (1922–2017)

Eliezer Spiegel אליעזר שפיגל
Personal information
- Date of birth: 20 June 1922
- Place of birth: Petah Tikva, Mandatory Palestine
- Date of death: 26 November 2017 (aged 95)
- Position: Forward

Senior career*
Years	Team	Apps	(Gls)
1938–40	Maccabi Petah Tikva		
1940–44	Beitar Tel Aviv		
1946–57	Maccabi Petah Tikva		

International career
1948–56	Israel	3	(0)

Managerial career
- 1955–57: Maccabi Petah Tikva
- 1957: Maccabi Hadera
- 1957–58: Hapoel Petah Tikva
- 1959: Hapoel Kfar Saba
- 1959–60: Maccabi Hadera
- 1960–61: Maccabi Petah Tikva
- 1961–62: Shimshon Tel Aviv
- 1962–65: Beitar Netanya
- 1965–66: Maccabi Tel Aviv
- 1966–67: Beitar Netanya
- 1967–69: Maccabi Sha'arayim
- 1969–74: Hakoah Ramat Gan
- 1974–75: Maccabi Netanya
- 1977–78: Maccabi Petah Tikva
- 1978–79: Maccabi Herzliya
- 1979–81: Hapoel Jerusalem
- 1981–82: Hapoel Ramat Gan
- 1982–84: Maccabi Jaffa
- 1984–86: Israel U-21
- 1986–87: Hapoel Marmorek
Medal record
Men's football
Representing Israel
AFC Asian Cup
Runner-up	1956 Hong Kong
- * Club domestic league appearances and goals

Eliezer Spiegel (Hebrew: אליעזר שפיגל; 20 June 1922 – 26 November 2017) was a footballer and manager, who played for Maccabi Petah Tikva, Beitar Tel Aviv and for the Israel national football team in the 1940s and 1950s.

== Playing career ==
Spiegel started playing football as in Maccabi Petah Tikva, playing against CAM Timișoara when the Romanian team visited Palestine in winter 1939. Spiegel appeared with Maccabi Petah Tikva in the 1939 Palestine Cup final, losing to Hapoel Tel Aviv 1–2.

In 1940, Spiegel moved to Beitar Tel Aviv and reached the 1942 Palestine Cup final, scoring 8 goals in the match, in which Beitar won 12–1 against Maccabi Haifa. In 1944, Spiegel was arrested as a suspected member of the Irgun and was sent to internment in Sembel camp, Eritrea, where he stayed until June 1946. Upon his release, Spiegel returned to Maccabi Petah Tikva, with whom he stayed until his retirement in 1957, winning the State Cup with the team in 1952 and winning top goal scorer in 1953–54.

Spiegel played three official matches for the national team between 1948 and 1956. Spiegel was part of the squad in Israel's inaugural match, against the U.S.A., assisting Israel's lone goal of the match in a 1–3 defeat. and later played for the national team against Cyprus in 1949 and made his final appearance for the national team 7 years late, in Israel's final match in the Asian Cup, against South Vietnam. I addition, Spiegel played two unofficial matches for the national team, scoring one goal in an informal meeting between the national teams of Israel and Cyprus, which was billed as a match between Tel Aviv and Nicosia

== Managerial career ==
Spiegel started his coaching career in Maccabi Petah Tikva in 1955, acting as player-manager. In 1956, Spiegel was appointed as an interim manager of the national team, when the IFA briefly sacked coach Jackie Gibbons ahead of the 1956 AFC Asian Cup. As Gibbons was reinstated as coach the national team for the competition itself, Spiegel acted as his assistant. In 1957 Spiegel was forced to leave Maccabi Petah Tikva and moved on to coach Maccabi Hadera which Spiegel led to promotion from Liga Bet (third division). Spiegel then had spells in Hapoel Petah Tikva, Hapoel Kfar Saba, Maccabi Hadera, Maccabi Petah Tikva and Shimshon Tel Aviv before coaching Beitar Netanya for three years.

In 1965 Spiegel moved to coach Maccabi Tel Aviv, where his son, Giora, was playing at the time. In September 1966, Spiegel was fired from Maccabi Tel Aviv, as the team's players demanded that he would be replaced and Spiegel returned to coach Beitar Netanya. In summer 1967 Spiegel began to coach Maccabi Sha'arayim and managed to save the team from relegation from the top division. Spiegel stayed with the club until February 1969, when he resigned. On 24 April 1969, Spiegel, together with Edmond Schmilovich, managed the national team's match against Austria, drawing 1–1, as Emmanuel Scheffer was coaching the U-19 national team at the 1969 AFC Youth Championship. In Summer 1969 Spiegel joined Hakoah Ramat Gan, where he stayed for the next five seasons, winning with the club the State Cup in 1971 and the league championship in 1972–73.

After leaving Hakoah Ramat Gan, Spiegel coached Maccabi Netanya, with which he finished as runner-up in the league, Maccabi Petah Tikva, which he assisted to gain promotion to the top division, Maccabi Herzliya, Hapoel Jerusalem, with which he won the second division and promoted to Liga Leumit, Hapoel Ramat Gan, which he also promoted to Liga Leumit and Maccabi Jaffa. In 1984 Spiegel was appointed as coach for the U-21 national team and assistant manager for the national team, which he coached in the 1985 Maccabiah Games, winning the gold medal. Spiegel left the u-21 team when his contract ended and signed on with Hapoel Marmorek, which was his final coaching position before retirement.

== Personal life ==
Spiegel's son Giora is a former footballer and manager. His son-in-law, Danny Begbleiter, and grandson Eyal Begbleiter were also footballers.

== Honours ==
=== Player ===
Beitar Tel Aviv

- State Cup: 1942

Maccabi Petah Tikva

- State Cup: 1951–52
- Maccabiah Games: 1950

Israel

- AFC Asian Cup: Runner-up, 1956

==== Individual ====
- Top Goalscorer: 1953–54 (16 goals)

=== Manager ===
- league championship (1):
  - 1972–73
- Second tier (1):
  - 1979–80
- State Cup (1):
  - 1970–71
- Maccabiah Games (1):
  - 1985
