= List of Hapoel Petah Tikva F.C. seasons =

This is a list of seasons played by Hapoel Petah Tikva Football Club in Israeli and European football, from 1934 (when the club was established) to the most recent completed season. It details the club's achievements in major competitions, and the top scorers for each season, if available. Top scorers in bold were also the top scorers in the Israeli league that season. Records of minor competitions such as the Lilian Cup are not included due to them being considered of less importance than the State Cup and the Toto Cup.

The club has won the six Israeli championships, two State Cups and four Toto cups, as well as several other minor trophies.

== History ==
Hapoel Petah Tikva Football Club was established in 1934 and joined the EIFA and competed in its competitions ever since. The club played in Palestine League during the abandoned 1934–35 league season and rejoined the league at its lowest level, third division, during the 1937–38 season. The club was promoted to the top division ahead of the 1941–42 season and remained at this level until being relegated at the end of the 1975–76 season, winning six championships between 1955 and 1963. The club was among the first to represent Israel in UEFA competitions by qualifying to the 1992–93 European Cup Winners' Cup.

== Seasons ==
Season	League									State Cup	League Cup	Europe	Top goalscorer (Note: Goals in all competitions (Liga Leumit or Liga Al, State Cup, Toto Cup and European) are counted.)	
Season	Division	P	W	D	L	F	A	Pts	Pos	State Cup	League Cup	Europe	Name	Goals
1934–35	Pal. League (Note: The 1934–35 league season was stopped to allow Maccabi club to prepare for the 1935 Maccabiah Games and wasn't renewed due to disagreement between Maccabi and Hapoel.)	8	5	2	1	15	5	12	2nd	–	–	–		
1935–36	–	–	–	–	–	–	–	–	–	– (Note: After three matches played in the first round the competition was abandoned due to the Arab Revolt.)	–	–		
1936–37	–	–	–	–	–	–	–	–	–	R1	–	–		
1937–38	Gimel; South	9	3	2	4	26	21	8	6th	–	–	–		
1938–39	Tel Aviv; Div. 2	22	13	4	5	63	34	30	4th	–	–	–		
1939–40	Bet; Samaria	18	11	3	4	71	32	25	4th	QF	–	–		
1940–41	–	–	–	–	–	–	–	–	–	R1	–	–		
1941–42	Pal. League; Southern (Note: The 1941–42 league season was held in three regional divisions followed by a play-off. The league season was lasted until fall 1943.)	26	13	5	8	55	49	31	6th	R1 (Note: Hapoel Petah Tikva was drawn to meet Maccabi Haifa. After a 0-0 draw in the first match, Maccabi Haifa won 3–2 in overtime in the replay. Hapoel Petah Tikva appealed the result, stating a Maccabi Haifa players was sent off during the match, only to be allowed to return at the beginning of overtime. Hapoel Petah Tikva won the appeal and a third match was set, to which Maccabi Haifa failed to appear. Hapoel Petah Tikva played Christian Club Jerusalem in the second round, winning 2–1, qualifying to the quarter-finals. However, Maccabi Haifa appealed their technical loss and the decision to set a second replay and won its appeal, reinstating the original 3–2 win over Hapoel Petah Tikva and the club's elimination at the first round.)	–	–		
1942–43	Pal. League; Southern	26	13	5	8	55	49	31	6th	R2	–	–		
1943–44	Pal. League	23	13	1	9	67	32	27	5th	Final (Note: The 1944 cup competitions began on 5 February 1944 and was completed during the following season, on 13 January 1945.)	–	–		
1944–45	Pal. League; Northern	11	4	2	5	14	13	10	5th	Final	–	–		
1945–46	–	–	–	–	–	–	–	–	–	QF	–	–		
1946–47	Pal. League	26	13	4	9	55	30	30	5th	SF	–	–		
1947–48	Pal. League (Note: The 1947–48 league was abandoned due to the 1948 Arab–Israeli War.)	7	3	1	3	15	12	7	5th	–	–	–		
1948–49	–	–	–	–	–	–	–	–	–	R1 (Note: The 1949 cup competition was delayed by appeals after the completion of the quarter-finals. After settling the appeals three further matches were played in February 1951, after which the competition was abandoned.)	–	–		
1949–50	Isr. League	24	15	4	5	63	31	33 (Note: The result of a match between Hapoel Petah Tikva and Beitar Tel Aviv was annulled and the match was given as a 0–0 without points.)	4th	R1	–	–		
1950–51	–	–	–	–	–	–	–	–	–	R1	–	–		
1951–52	Alef	22	10	7	5	38	20	27	4th	SF	–	–		
1952–53	–	–	–	–	–	–	–	–	–	SF	–	–		
1953–54	Alef	22	12	3	7	55	25	27	3rd	SF	–	–		
1954–55	Alef	26	18	4	4	68	23	40	1st	Final	–	–		
1955–56	Leumit	22	12	5	5	54	28	29	2nd	–	–	–		
1956–57	Leumit	18	10	4	2	42	25	24	2nd	Winners	–	–		
1957–58	Leumit	22	15	4	3	50	21	34	2nd	QF	–	–		
1958–59	Leumit	22	13	9	0	49	18	33	1st	Final	R1	–		
1959–60	Leumit	22	14	3	5	65	29	31	1st	Final	–	–		
1960–61	Leumit	22	16	4	2	48	15	36	1st	Final	–	–		
1961–62	Leumit	22	12	4	6	35	19	28	1st	SF	–	–		
1962–63	Leumit	22	13	6	3	38	17	32	1st	SF	–	–		
1963–64	Leumit	28	15	8	5	50	29	38	3rd	R5	–	–		
1964–65	Leumit	30	15	7	8	54	42	37	2nd	Round of 16	–	–		
1965–66	Leumit	30	10	14	6	42	29	34	3rd	Round of 16	–	–		
1966–67	Leumit	60	27	21	12	72	48	75	2nd	Round of 16	–	–		
1967–68	Leumit	60	27	21	12	72	48	75	2nd	Final	–	–		
1968–69	Leumit	30	8	10	12	27	30	26	9th	Round of 16	Winners	–		
1969–70	Leumit	30	8	14	8	25	28	30	7th	Round of 16	–	–		
1970–71	Leumit	30	11	12	7	26	17	34	4th	Round of 16	–	–		
1971–72	Leumit	30	8	9	13	24	37	25	11th	R6	–	–		
1972–73	Leumit	30	8	12	10	26	26	28	12th	QF	Group	–		
1973–74	Leumit	30	11	10	9	35	31	32	4th	Final	–	–		
1974–75	Leumit	30	11	7	12	32	33	29	9th	Round of 16	–	–		
1975–76	Leumit	34	10	13	11	27	28	33	15th	SF	–	–		
1976–77	Artzit	22	8	8	6	32	21	24	5th	R6	–	–		
1977–78	Artzit	26	11	8	7	37	27	30	5th	R7	–	–		
1978–79	Artzit	30	13	12	5	40	24	38	3rd	Round of 16	–	–		
1979–80	Leumit	30	8	12	10	21	34	28	9th	Round of 16	–	–		
1980–81	Leumit	30	7	15	8	25	29	29	12th	QF	–	–		
1981–82	Leumit	30	3	8	19	13	39	14	16th	R7	–	–		
1982–83	Artzit	30	13	8	9	34	31	47	6th	R7	–	–		
1983–84	Artzit	30	14	10	6	38	18	52	3rd	Round of 16	–	–		
1984–85	Leumit	30	11	10	9	30	27	43	6th	QF	Group	–		
1985–86	Leumit	30	9	8	13	42	44	35	13th	Round of 16	Winners	–		
1986–87	Leumit	30	7	15	8	31	30	38	10th	QF	Group	–		
1987–88	Leumit	33	12	10	11	47	41	46	5th	QF	Group	–		
1988–89	Leumit	31	15	11	5	36	20	54 (Note: Hapoel Petah Tikva were deducted two points for violation of budgetary regulations.)	2nd	QF	Group	–		
1989–90	Leumit	32	16	10	6	40	21	58	2nd	SF	Winners	–		
1990–91	Leumit	32	20	10	2	63	27	70	2nd	Final	Winners	–		
1991–92	Leumit	32	11	10	11	34	35	43	4th	Winners	SF	–		
1992–93	Leumit	30	10	6	17	41	44	36	1st	Round of 16	Final	CWC, R1		
1993–94	Leumit	39	12	12	15	53	56	48	7th	QF	Group	–		
1994–95	Leumit	30	12	8	10	42	36	44	5th	QF	Group	–		
1995–96	Leumit	30	7	15	8	31	40	36	8th	R8	Group	Intertoto, Group		
1996–97	Leumit	30	18	6	6	57	37	60	2nd	Round of 16	Group	–		
1997–98	Leumit	30	12	6	12	41	41	42	5th	QF	Group	UEFA Cup, R1		
1998–99	Leumit	30	13	7	10	54	47	46	6th	SF	Group	–		
1999–2000	Premier	39	23	5	11	77	52	74	3rd	R8	R2	–		
2000–01	Premier	38	13	8	17	43	52	47	8th	R8	QF	Intertoto, R1		
2001–02	Premier	33	13	8	12	39	35	47	6th	SF	QF	–		
2002–03	Premier	33	11	6	16	41	53	39	8th	R8	Group	–		
2003–04	Premier	33	11	9	13	46	52	42	8th	R8	QF	–		
2004–05	Premier	33	11	9	13	41	46	42	7th	QF	Winners	–		
2005–06	Premier	33	9	10	14	38	50	37	9th	R9	Group	–		
2006–07	Premier	33	3	10	20	29	61	16 (Note: Hapoel Petah Tikva were deducted three points.)	12th	R9	Group	–	Saïd Makasi	6
2007–08	Leumit	33	16	6	11	40	27	54	2nd	Round of 16	Winners	–	M'peti Nimba	16
2008–09	Premier	33	8	7	18	30	42	31	10th	Round of 16	Group	–	Shimon Abuhatzira	16
2009–10	Premier	35	8	14	13	28	48	23 (Note: Hapoel Petah Tikva scored 31 points in the regular season, which were halved at the beginning of the play-offs. The club scored 7 more points during the play-offs for a total of 38 points.)	13th	Round of 16	QF	–	Elnatan Salami	11
2010–11	Premier	35	10	8	7	42	58	22 (Note: Hapoel Petah Tikva scored 33 points in the regular season, which were halved at the beginning of the play-offs. The club scored 5 more points during the play-offs for a total of 38 points.)	14th	Round of 16	Group	–	Dudu Biton	13
2011–12	Premier	37	8	11	18	36	55	26 (Note: Hapoel Petah Tikva had nine points deducted for entering administration.)	16th	R8	Group	–	Yaniv Luzon	9
2012–13	Leumit	37	15	8	14	45	48	53	5th	R8	QF	–	Or Fischbein	8
2013–14	Leumit	37	18	10	9	50	39	64	2nd	Round of 16	–	–	Lior Asulin	17
2014–15	Premier	33	8	8	17	43	59	32	13th	Round of 16	QF	–	Shahar Hirsh	9
2015–16	Leumit	37	13	13	11	54	55	52	6th	R7	SF	–	Ben Azubel	17

== Key ==
- P = Played
- W = Games won
- D = Games drawn
- L = Games lost
- F = Goals for
- A = Goals against
- Pts = Points
- Pos = Final position
- Premier = Ligat HaAl
  (Premier League) (1st tier since 2000)
- Leumit = Liga Leumit
  (1st tier 1955 to 2000; 2nd tier since 2000)
- Artzit = Liga Artzit
  (2nd tier 1977 to 2000; 3rd tier 2000 to 2009)
- Alef = Liga Alef
  (1st tier 1947 to 1955; 2nd tier 1955 to 1977; 3rd tier 1977 to 2000 and since 2009)
- Pal. League = Palestine League
- R1 = Round 1
- R2 = Round 2
- R3 = Round 3
- R4 = Round 4
- R5 = Round 5
- R6 = Round 6
- R7 = Round 7
- R8 = Round 8
- R9 = Round 9
- QF = Quarter-finals
- SF = Semi-finals
- Group = Group stage

Champions	Runners-up	Promoted	Relegated
