= 1955–56 Hapoel Petah Tikva F.C. season =

Hapoel Petah Tikva
1955–56 season
- Manager: Moshe Varon
- Stadium: Hapoel Ground, Petah Tikva
- Liga Alef (1955) Liga Leumit (1956): Winners; 2nd
- State Cup: Runners-up
- Top goalscorer: League: Stelmach (26); All: Stelmach (31)

The 1955–56 Hapoel Petah Tikva season was the club's 21st season since its establishment in 1935, and 8th since the establishment of the State of Israel.

At the start of the season, the league which started during the previous season was completed, with the club finishing 1st, winning its first ever championship. The new league season, with the top division being re-named Liga Leumit, began on 3 December 1955 and was completed on 3 June 1956, with the club finishing as runners-up.

During the season, the club also competed in the State Cup, which was also carried over the summer break. The club eliminated Beitar Tel Aviv and Hapoel Ramat Gan to reach the cup final against Hapoel Petah Tikva. Maccabi Tel Aviv won the match 3–1 and won its 8th State Cup.

== Match Results ==
=== Legend ===
Win Draw Loss

=== International friendly matches ===
During the season Hapoel Petah Tikva played two international friendly matches, drawing one and winning the other.

In February 1956 the Israeli government lifted the ban on hosting teams from Austria and Hapoel and Maccabi Petah Tikva invited Kapfenberger SV to a tour of Israel. The visit was met with criticism from right-wing politicians and acts of sabotage in order to stop the Austrian team from playing, but the matches went ahead as planned.

12 February 1956	Hapoel Petah Tikva	2–2	Kapfenberger SV	Petah Tikva
	Kofman 17'; Flascher 45' (o.g.)	Davar (in Hebrew)	41' Bihas; 59' Gollnhuber	Stadium: Hapoel Ground; Attendance: 3,500

6 June 1956	Hapoel Petah Tikva	3–0	São Cristóvão	Petah Tikva
	Kofman 18'; Stelmach 51'; Ratzabi 75'	Davar (in Hebrew)		Stadium: Hapoel Ground; Attendance: 5,000; Referee: Dudkevich

=== 1954–55 Liga Alef ===
The league began on 6 February 1955, and by the time the previous season ended, only 20 rounds of matches were completed, with the final 6 rounds being played during September and October 1955.

==== Final table ====
Pos	Club	P	W	D	L	GF	GA	Gr	Pts	Notes
1	Hapoel Petah Tikva	26	18	4	4	68	23	2.96	40	Champions
2	Maccabi Tel Aviv	26	17	4	5	84	28	3.00	38	
3	Hapoel Tel Aviv	26	12	9	5	49	23	2.13	33	
4	Maccabi Netanya	26	13	7	6	54	43	1.26	33	
5	Beitar Tel Aviv	26	12	5	9	64	47	1.36	29	

==== Matches ====
3 September 1955 21	Beitar Jerusalem	2–1	Hapoel Petah Tikva	Jerusalem
	Elfasi 49'; Yehezkel 58'	Report (p. 8)	Kofman 72'	Stadium: YMCA Stadium; Attendance: 7,000; Referee: Werner

10 September 1955 22	Hapoel Petah Tikva	3–1	Hapoel Hadera	Petah Tikva
	Stelmach 28', 40', 60'	Report (p. 8)	12' (pen.) Weinberg	Stadium: Hapoel Ground; Attendance: 2,000; Referee: Scheindling

24 September 1955 23	Hapoel Petah Tikva	13–2	Hapoel Balfouria	Petah Tikva
	Chirik 3', 23', 42'; Kofman 22', 73'; Markus 26', 53', 81'; Stelmach 28', 77', 85', 89'; Zelikovich 58'	Report (p. 8)	18' Dubnov; 57' Tal	Stadium: Hapoel Ground; Attendance: 500; Referee: Zahavi

1 October 1955 24	Hapoel Haifa	3–9	Hapoel Petah Tikva	Haifa
	Kremer 13'; Nestenfober 65'; Schneid 71'	Report (p. 8)	2', 12', 29', 39', 87' Stelmach; 35' Chirik; 70', 73', 86' Kofman	Stadium: Kiryat Haim Stadium; Attendance: 3,000; Referee: Dudkevich

8 October 1955 25	Hapoel Petah Tikva	3–0	Maccabi Rehovot	Petah Tikva
	Kofman 6'; Stelmach 12'; Zelikovich 60'	Report (p. 8)		Stadium: Hapoel Ground; Attendance: 4,000; Referee: Nahman Cohen

15 October 1955 26	Hapoel Tel Aviv	0–1	Hapoel Petah Tikva	Tel Aviv
		Report (p. 8)	49' Kofman	Stadium: Basa Stadium; Attendance: 6,500; Referee: Werner

==== Results by match ====
Round	1	2	3	4	5	6	7	8	9	10	11	12	13	14	15	16	17	18	19	20	21	22	23	24	25	26
Result	W	D	W	W	W	W	W	W	W	W	W	W	W	D	W	L	D	L	L	D	L	W	W	W	W	L
Position	3	4	4	3	1	1	1	1	1	1	1	1	1	1	1	1	1	1	2	2	2	2	2	1	1	1

Updated to match(es) played on 15 October 1955. Source: 2 Dear Points
W = Win; D = Draw; L = Loss

=== 1955–56 Liga Leumit ===
==== Final table ====
Pos	Club	P	W	D	L	GF	GA	GR	Pts	Notes
1	Hapoel Petah Tikva	22	13	6	3	47	16	2.94	32	Champions
2	Hapoel Petah Tikva	22	12	5	5	54	28	1.93	29	
3	Hapoel Tel Aviv	22	12	5	5	49	29	1.69	29	
4	Maccabi Petah Tikva	22	10	7	5	47	34	1.38	27	
5	Maccabi Haifa	22	11	3	8	51	29	1.76	25	

==== Matches ====
3 December 1955 1	Maccabi Haifa	1–2	Hapoel Petah Tikva	Haifa
	Almani 80'		24' (pen.) Kofman; 76' Chirik	Stadium: Kiryat Eliezer Stadium; Attendance: 4,000; Referee: Ben-Rubi

10 December 1955 2	Maccabi Tel Aviv	1–1	Hapoel Petah Tikva	Tel Aviv
	Merimovich 77'		36' Haldi	Stadium: Basa Stadium; Attendance: 5,000; Referee: Werner

17 December 1955 3	Hapoel Petah Tikva	4–2	Maccabi Jaffa	Petah Tikva
	Kofman 23', 50', 63'; Zelikovich 80'		86' Ghougasian; 89' B. Cohen	Stadium: Hapoel Ground; Attendance: 3,500; Referee: Markovich

24 December 1955 4	Maccabi Netanya	1–3	Hapoel Petah Tikva	Netanya
	H. Meller 81'		68' Kofman; 70' Stelmach; 75' Markus	Stadium: Sar-Tov Stadium; Attendance: 2,000; Referee: Klein

31 December 1955 5	Hapoel Petah Tikva	2–0	Beitar Tel Aviv	Petah Tikva
	Kofman 12' (pen.); Zelikovich 72'			Stadium: Hapoel Ground; Attendance: 3,000; Referee: Frizner

7 January 1956 6	Hapoel Petah Tikva	3–0	Hapoel Ramat Gan	Petah Tikva
	Mizrahi 27'; Stelmach 46'; Kofman 60'	Report		Stadium: Hapoel Ground; Attendance: 2,500; Referee: Yunes

14 January 1956 7	Hapoel Kfar Saba	2–1	Hapoel Petah Tikva	Kfar Saba
	Bonin 11'; Tobiash 47'		65' Nahari	Stadium: Hapoel Ground; Attendance: 1,500; Referee: Dudkevich

21 January 1956 8	Hapoel Tel Aviv	1–0	Hapoel Petah Tikva	Tel Aviv
	Michaelov 45'			Stadium: Basa Stadium; Attendance: 7,000; Referee: Sher

11 February 1956 9	Hapoel Petah Tikva	2–2	Hapoel Haifa	Petah Tikva
	Kofman 22' (pen.); Zelikovich 35'		57' Schneid; 62' M. Simantiris	Stadium: Hapoel Ground; Attendance: 3,000; Referee: Rosenbaum

18 February 1956 10	Maccabi Petah Tikva	4–4	Hapoel Petah Tikva	Petah Tikva
	Spiegel 7'; Nadel 61', 64'; Bernard 68'		14', 35' Stelmach; 74' Kofman; 80' Nahari	Stadium: Maccabi Ground; Attendance: 4,000; Referee: Werner

25 February 1956 11	Hapoel Petah Tikva	3–0	Maccabi Rehovot	Petah Tikva
	Zelikovich 44'; Nahari 68'; Stemlach 89'			Stadium: Hapoel Ground

3 March 1956 12	Hapoel Petah Tikva	1–3	Maccabi Haifa	Petah Tikva
	Z. Ratzabi 33'		16', 55' S. Levi; 60' Hardy	Stadium: Hapoel Ground; Attendance: 4,000; Referee: Fritzner

10 March 1956 13	Hapoel Petah Tikva	1–1	Maccabi Tel Aviv	Petah Tikva
	Kofman 44'		37' Nahmias	Stadium: Hapoel Ground; Attendance: 6,000; Referee: Ben-Rubi

17 March 1956 14	Maccabi Jaffa	3–3	Hapoel Petah Tikva	Tel Aviv
	Ghougasian 54', 69'; Aroyo 78'		38' Kofman; 59', 63' Stelmach	Stadium: Maccabi Jaffa Ground; Attendance: 3,000; Referee: Frizner

24 March 1956 15	Hapoel Petah Tikva	6–0	Maccabi Netanya	Petah Tikva
	Nahari 6', 19', 78'; Stelmach 57'; Z. Ratzabi 65'; Kofman 81'			Stadium: Hapoel Ground; Referee: Dudkevich

31 March 1956 16	Beitar Tel Aviv	1–2	Hapoel Petah Tikva	Tel Aviv
	Arbiv 61'		1' Stelmach; 59' Z. Ratzabi	Stadium: Maccabi Jaffa Ground; Attendance: 6,000; Referee: Ben-Rubi

7 April 1956 17	Hapoel Ramat Gan	2–5	Hapoel Petah Tikva	Givatayim
	Mesika 19'; Kirschenberg 60'		6' Kofman; 37', 72' Stelmach; 42' Ratzabi; 55' Varon	Stadium: HaMakhtesh Stadium; Referee: Werner

14 April 1956 18	Hapoel Petah Tikva	4–0	Hapoel Kfar Saba	Petah Tikva
	Rabayov 3'; Zelikovich 18'; Kofman 77'; Ratzabi 88'			Stadium: Hapoel Ground; Referee: Moshe Cohen

22 April 1956 19	Hapoel Petah Tikva	1–2	Hapoel Tel Aviv	Petah Tikva
	Vissoker 65' (pen.)		20' Michaelov; 30' (pen.) Balut	Stadium: Hapoel Ground; Attendance: 6,000; Referee: Fritzner

19 May 1956 20	Hapoel Haifa	1–0	Hapoel Petah Tikva	Haifa
	Schneid 73'			Stadium: Kiryat Eliezer Stadium; Attendance: 6,000; Referee: Moshe Cohen

27 May 1956 21	Hapoel Petah Tikva	3–1	Maccabi Petah Tikva	Petah Tikva
	Z. Ratzabi 1'; Stelmach 27'; Nahari 74'		4' Spiegel	Stadium: Hapoel Ground; Attendance: 5,000; Referee: Frizner

2 June 1956 22	Maccabi Rehovot	0–3	Hapoel Petah Tikva	Rehovot
			28' Stelmach; 60' (pen.) Kermer; 85' Nahari	Stadium: Maccabi Ground; Referee: Fried

==== Results by match ====
Round	1	2	3	4	5	6	7	8	9	10	11	12	13	14	15	16	17	18	19	20	21	22
Result	W	D	W	W	W	W	L	L	D	D	W	L	L	D	D	W	W	W	L	L	W	W
Position	3	4	2	4	2	1	1	2	2	3	2	4	4	3	2	1	1	1	3	4	3	2

Updated to match(es) played on 28 July 1956. Source: IFA
W = Win; D = Draw; L = Loss

=== State Cup ===
27 August 1955 QF	Beitar Tel Aviv	0–4	Hapoel Petah Tikva	Tel Aviv
		Report (p. 8)	47', 59' Chirik; 61' Stelmach; 75' Zelikovich	Stadium: Basa Stadium; Attendance: 7,000; Referee: Frizner

22 October 1955 SF	Hapoel Petah Tikva	2–0	Hapoel Ramat Gan	Tel Aviv
	Chirik 32'; Stelmach 86'	Report (p. 8)		Stadium: Basa Stadium; Attendance: 2,500; Referee: Sher

19 November 1955 F	Hapoel Petah Tikva	1–3	Maccabi Tel Aviv	Tel Aviv
	Kofman 84'	Report (p. 8)	8' Nahmias; 35' Glazer; 68' Studinski	Stadium: Basa Stadium; Attendance: 12,000; Referee: Fritzner

=== Shapira Cup ===
In October and November, while the promotion playoffs and the State Cup were being played, two cup competitions were organized by Liga Leumit Clubs, the second edition of the Shapira Cup, and the Netanya 25th Anniversary Cup. Maccabi Haifa, Hapoel Petah Tikva, Hapoel Tel Aviv and Maccabi Tel Aviv played for the Shapira Cup, named after former Hapoel Tel Aviv treasurer Yosef Shapira. The competition was designed to be played as a double round-robin tournament but the competition was delayed after the teams playing only two matches each, as the third round matches were postponed due to weather conditions and then due to the 1954–55 Israel State Cup final, which involved Maccabi Tel Aviv and Hapoel Petah Tikva. As league matches started on 3 December 1955, the competition was abandoned altogether.

==== Table ====
Pos	Team	Pld	W	D	L	GF	GA	GR	Pts
1	Maccabi Tel Aviv	2	2	0	0	7	4	1.750	4
2	Maccabi Haifa	2	1	0	1	7	7	1.000	2
3	Hapoel Petah Tikva	2	1	0	1	6	6	1.000	2
4	Hapoel Tel Aviv	2	0	0	2	3	6	0.500	0

Source: Hadshot HaSport, p. 1

27 August 1955 1	Maccabi Haifa	4–2	Hapoel Petah Tikva	Tel Aviv
	Ben-Tzvi 60' (pen.); Parizat 69' (o.g.); S. Levi 88'; Held 89'		24' Kofman; 40' Stelmach	Stadium: Basa Stadium; Attendance: 5,000; Referee: Dudkevich

5 November 1955 2	Hapoel Tel Aviv	2–4	Hapoel Petah Tikva	Tel Aviv
	Weiss 12', 15'	Report (p. 8)	11' Stelmach; 27', 65' Kofman; 68' Markus	Stadium: Basa Stadium; Attendance: 3,000; Referee: Rosenbaum
