= List of Hapoel Ramat Gan F.C. seasons =

This is a list of seasons played by Hapoel Ramat Gan Football Club in Israeli and European football, from 1939–40 (when the club first competed in the league) to the most recent completed season. It details the club's achievements in major competitions, and the top scorers for each season. Top scorers in bold were also the top scorers in the Israeli league that season. Records of minor competitions such as the Lilian Cup are not included due to them being considered of less importance than the State Cup and the Toto Cup.

== History ==
Hapoel Ramat Gan was established in 1927 and was first promoted to the top division ahead of the 1941–42 season. The club stayed at the top division until the end of the 1959–60 season. The club won the second division on 1962–63 and was promoted to back to the top division. The following season the club won the league championship. Since 1970 the club played mainly in the second division. In 2002–03 the club won the Israel State Cup, becoming the first club outside the top division to win the cup. The club won a second cup in 2012–13.

== Seasons ==
Season	League									State Cup	League Cup	International (Asia/Europe)	Top goalscorer (Note: Goals in all competitions (Liga Leumit or Liga Al, State Cup, Toto Cup and European) are counted.)	
Season	Division	P	W	D	L	F	A	Pts	Pos	State Cup	League Cup	International (Asia/Europe)	Name	Goals
1939–40	Bet Samaria	18	12	2	4	83	34	26	3rd	R2	–	–		
1940–41	–	–	–	–	–	–	–	–	–	R1	–	–		
1941–42	Pal. League; Southern (Note: The 1941–42 league season was held in three regional divisions followed by a play-off. The league season was lasted until fall 1943.)	26	9	4	13	54	67	22	9th	R2	–	–		
1942–43	Pal. League; Southern	26	9	4	13	54	67	22	9th	QF	–	–		
1943–44	Pal. League	25	9	7	9	61	55	25	7th	R1 (Note: The 1944 cup competitions began on 5 February 1944 and was completed during the following season, on 13 January 1945.)	–	–		
1944–45	Pal. League; Northern	10	5	3	2	29	16	13	2nd	R1	–	–		
1945–46	–	–	–	–	–	–	–	–	–	R1	–	–		
1946–47	Pal. League	26	12	6	8	62	56	30	6th	QF	–	–		
1947–48	Pal. League (Note: The 1947–48 league was abandoned due to the 1948 Arab–Israeli War.)	5	2	1	2	14	11	5	8th	–	–	–		
1948–49	–	–	–	–	–	–	–	–	–	SF (Note: The 1949 cup competition was delayed by appeals after the completion of the quarter-finals. After settling the appeals three further matches were played in February 1951, and the competition was abandoned.)	–	–		
1949–50	Isr. League	24	8	0	16	47	62	16	10th	SF	–	–		
1950–51	–	–	–	–	–	–	–	–	–	SF	–	–		
1951–52	Alef	22	7	3	12	37	46	17	8th	QF	–	–		
1952–53	–	–	–	–	–	–	–	–	–	Round of 16	–	–		
1953–54	Alef	22	8	4	10	31	35	20	6th	Round of 16	–	–		
1954–55	Alef	26	10	3	13	35	41	23	10th	SF	–	–		
1955–56	Leumit	22	9	0	13	28	42	18	9th	–	–	–		
1956–57	Leumit	18	4	2	12	23	32	12	9th	R5	–	–		
1957–58	Leumit	22	6	8	8	21	33	20	6th	SF	–	–		
1958–59	Leumit	22	6	7	9	26	36	19	8th	R6	R1	–		
1959–60	Leumit	22	7	2	13	31	50	16	12th	Round of 16	–	–		
1960–61	Alef	26	12	5	9	36	36	29	5th	Round of 16	–	–		
1961–62	Alef	26	10	7	9	49	47	27	5th	R5	–	–		
1962–63	Alef	30	23	5	2	84	22	51	1st	QF	–	–		
1963–64	Leumit	28	17	6	5	52	33	40	1st	QF	–	–		
1964–65	Leumit	30	12	6	12	34	34	30	8th	R4	–	–		
1965–66	Leumit	30	12	10	8	40	32	34	5th	QF	–	–		
1966–67	Leumit	60	15	24	21	65	69	54	11th	Round of 16	–	–		
1967–68	Leumit	60	15	24	21	65	69	54	11th	Round of 16	–	–		
1968–69	Leumit	30	5	8	17	11	42	18	16th	R6	Group	–		
1969–70	Alef North	30	10	8	12	34	31	28	13th	R5	–	–		
1970–71	Alef North	30	21	7	2	54	16	49	2nd	R4	–	–		
1971–72	Alef North	30	16	6	8	41	28	38	3rd	R6	–	–		
1972–73	Alef North	30	15	6	9	49	34	36	3rd	R6	Final	–		
1973–74	Alef North	30	16	10	4	48	16	42	3rd	Round of 16	–	–		
1974–75	Alef North	30	13	7	10	41	29	33	3rd	Round of 16	–	–		
1975–76	Alef North	32	18	10	4	49	19	44 (Note: Hapoel Ramat Gan had two points deducted.)	3rd	QF	QF	–		
1976–77	Artzit	22	11	8	3	32	13	30	3rd	R4	–	–		
1977–78	Artzit	26	8	3	15	22	38	19	12th	R6	–	–		
1978–79	Artzit	30	10	10	10	33	38	30	8th	R7	–	–		
1979–80	Artzit	30	13	13	4	36	19	39	2nd	R7	–	–		
1980–81	Leumit	30	3	6	21	15	58	12	16th	Round of 16	–	–		
1981–82	Artzit	30	15	9	6	41	22	39	2nd	Round of 16	–	–		
1982–83	Leumit	30	6	15	9	15	21	33	14th	R7	–	–		
1983–84	Artzit	30	11	10	9	26	25	43	7th	R7	–	–		
1984–85	Artzit	30	9	8	13	32	45	35	11th	R7	Group	–		
1985–86	Artzit	30	10	7	13	35	37	37	11th		Group	–		
1986–87	Artzit	30	9	11	10	23	26	38	12th (Note: Hapoel Ramat Gan played in promotion/relegation play-offs against 11th placed Hapoel Marmorek and Liga Alef winners Maccabi Hadera and Hapoel Bat Yam. The club finished second and remained in Liga Artzit.)	R7	Group	–		
1987–88	Artzit	33	11	8	14	31	36	41	7th		Final Group	–		
1988–89	Artzit	31	20	5	6	52	26	65	1st	Round of 16	Group	–		
1989–90	Leumit	32	8	12	12	24	34	36	11th	Round of 16	Group	–		
1990–91	Artzit	30	15	6	9	61	39	51	3rd	Round of 16	Group	–		
1991–92	Artzit	30	9	8	13	41	45	35	10th	Round of 16	Group	–		
1992–93	Artzit	30	8	10	12	34	39	34	15th	R8	Group	–		
1993–94	Alef North	30	22	5	3	71	26	47	1st		–	–		
1994–95	Artzit	30	11	9	10	38	36	42	Round of 16	Final	–			
1995–96	Artzit	30	10	10	10	34	32	40	6th	Round of 16	Group	–		
1996–97	Artzit	30	9	11	10	29	26	38	8th		Group	–		
1997–98	Artzit	30	6	8	16	31	52	26	15th	R8	Group	–		
1998–99	Alef South	30	18	9	3	71	32	63	2nd	R7	–	–		
1999–2000	Artzit	33	20	7	6	62	30	67	1st	R8	Winners	–		
2000–01	Leumit	38	13	13	12	45	49	52	4th	R8	R1	–		
2001–02	Leumit	33	11	4	18	31	51	37	10th	R8	R1	–		
2002–03	Leumit	33	10	9	14	44	53	39	7th	Winners	Group	–		
2003–04	Leumit	33	6	10	17	29	47	28	12th	R8	Group	UEFA Cup, R1		
2004–05	Artzit	33	8	13	12	41	52	37	8th	R9	Final	–		
2005–06	Artzit	33	11	14	8	42	27	38 (Note: Hapoel Ramat Gan had 9 points deducted.)	10th		Winners	–		
2006–07	Artzit	33	19	9	5	46	21	66	1st	SF	Winners	–	Eliran Asao	18
2007–08	Leumit	33	13	9	11	33	38	48	6th	Round of 16	Group	–	George Datoru	13
2008–09	Leumit	33	14	11	8	37	31	53	4th	R9	QF	–	Mor Golan	12
2009–10	Leumit	35	9	11	15	34	49	22 (Note: Hapoel Ramat Gan scored 33 points in the regular season, which were halved at the beginning of the play-offs. The club scored 5 more points during the play-offs for a total of 38 points.)	14th (Note: Hapoel Ramat Gan played in a promotion/relegation play-off against the 3rd placed club in Liga Leumit, Hapoel Kfar Saba. The club won 1–0 and remained in the Premier League.)	QF	Group	–	George Datoru; Serge Ayeli	8
2010–11	Leumit	35	3	9	23	24	65	10 (Note: Hapoel Ramat Gan scored 8 points in the regular season (after 4 points were deducted), which were halved at the beginning of the play-offs. The club scored 6 more points during the play-offs for a total of 14 points.)	16th	R8	Group	–	Dimitar Telkiyski	5
2011–12	Premier	35	21	6	8	54	26	37 (Note: Hapoel Ramat Gan scored 59 points in the regular season, which were halved at the beginning of the play-offs. The club scored 10 more points during the play-offs, of which 3 points were deducted for the club's part in a brawl following its match against Hapoel Bnei Lod, for a total of 66 points.)	1st (Note: As Hapoel Ramat Gan finished level on points with Hapoel Bnei Lod and Maccabi Herzliya, the two teams with the better goal difference, Hapoel Ramat Gan and Bnei Lod, played in a promotion play-off match, in which Hapoel Ramat Gan won 2–0.)	Round of 16	Winners	–	Lior Asulin	14
2012–13	Premier	33	7	9	17	38	46	30	14th	Winners	SF	–	David Manga	18
2013–14	Leumit	37	13	13	11	52	38	52	5th	R8	–	EL, 3QR	Liron Diamant	11
2014–15	Leumit	37	11	14	12	39	47	47	7th	R7	Group	–	Almog Buzaglo; Liron Diamant	9
2015–16	Leumit	37	14	14	9	56	38	56	3rd	Round of 16	Group	–	Didier Brossou	16

== Key ==
- P = Played
- W = Games won
- D = Games drawn
- L = Games lost
- F = Goals for
- A = Goals against
- Pts = Points
- Pos = Final position
- Leumit = Liga Leumit (National League)
- Artzit = Liga Artzit (Nationwide League)
- Premier = Liga Al (Premier League)
- Pal. League = Palestine League
- F = Final
- Group = Group stage
- QF = Quarter-finals
- QR1 = First Qualifying Round
- QR2 = Second Qualifying Round
- QR3 = Third Qualifying Round
- QR4 = Fourth Qualifying Round
- RInt = Intermediate Round
- R1 = Round 1
- R2 = Round 2
- R3 = Round 3
- R4 = Round 4
- R5 = Round 5
- R6 = Round 6
- SF = Semi-finals

Champions	Runners-up	Promoted	Relegated
