= 1955–56 Hapoel Ramat Gan F.C. season =

Hapoel Ramat Gan
1955–56 season
- Manager: Haim Reich
- Stadium: HaMakhtesh Stadium
- Liga Alef (1955) Liga Leumit (1956): 10th 9th
- State Cup: Semi-finals
- Top goalscorer: Kirschenberg (12)

The 1955–56 Hapoel Ramat Gan season was the club's 30th season since its establishment in 1927, and 8th since the establishment of the State of Israel.

At the start of the season, the league which started during the previous season was completed, with the club finishing 10th. The new league season, with the top division being renamed Liga Leumit, began on 3 December 1955 and was completed on 3 June 1956, with the club finishing 9th.

During the season, the club also competed in the State Cup, which was also carried over the summer break. The club eliminated Maccabi Petah Tikva in the quarter finals, winning 1–0 in extra time, and losing at the semi-final to Hapoel Petah Tikva 0–2.

In addition, during the break between the completion of the 1954–55 league and the beginning of the 1955–56 league, the club participated in the Netanya 25th anniversary cup, along with Beitar Tel Aviv, Maccabi Petah Tikva and Hapoel Ramat Gan. In the competition, which was played as a round-robin tournament, the club finished second.

== Match Results ==
=== Legend ===
Win Draw Loss

=== 1954–55 Liga Alef ===
The league began on 6 February 1955, and by the time the previous season ended, only 20 rounds of matches were completed, with the final 6 rounds being played during September and October 1955.

==== Final table ====
Pos	Club	P	W	D	L	GF	GA	GR	Pts	
8	Maccabi Rehovot	26	11	4	11	49	48	1.02	26	
9	Hapoel Haifa	26	9	6	11	40	55	0.73	24	
10	Hapoel Ramat Gan	26	10	3	13	35	41	0.85	23	
11	Beitar Jerusalem	26	8	5	13	37	59	0.63	21	Promotion/relegation play-offs
12	Hapoel Kfar Saba	26	6	6	14	38	46	0.83	18	Promotion/relegation play-offs

==== Matches ====
3 September 1955 21	Hapoel Tel Aviv	2–0	Hapoel Ramat Gan	Tel Aviv
	Weiss 22', 86'	Report (p. 8)		Stadium: Basa Stadium; Attendance: 4,000; Referee: Dudkevich

10 September 1955 22	Hapoel Ramat Gan	5–0	Maccabi Petah Tikva	Givatayim
	R. Cohen 40', 75'; Fritzner 47', 66'; Pulaver 80'	Report (p. 8)		Stadium: HaMakhtesh Stadium; Attendance: 1,000; Referee: Fried

24 September 1955 23	Hapoel Ramat Gan	4–3	Hapoel Kfar Saba	Givatayim
	Chronsich 3', 47'; R. Cohen 23'; Fritzner 74'	Report (p. 8)	43' H. Glazer; 50' Tobiash; 51' Bulman	Stadium: HaMakhtesh Stadium; Attendance: 3,000; Referee: Moshe Cohen

1 October 1955 24	Beitar Jerusalem	0–1	Hapoel Ramat Gan	Jerusalem
		Report (p. 8)	57' R. Cohen	Stadium: YMCA Stadium; Attendance: 7,000; Referee: Frizner

8 October 1955 25	Maccabi Netanya	5–1	Hapoel Ramat Gan	Netanya
	I. Caspi 47', 68'; M. Cohen 50', 70'; Yehezkel 82'	Report (p. 8)	52' Fritzner	Stadium: Sar-Tov Stadium; Attendance: 2,500; Referee: Werner

15 October 1955 26	Hapoel Ramat Gan	1–4	Maccabi Tel Aviv	Givatayim
	Kirschenberg 38' (pen.)	Report (p. 8)	24' Rabinovich; 50' Israeli; 69' (pen.) Merimovich; 73' R. Levi	Stadium: HaMakhtesh Stadium; Attendance: 3,500; Referee: Fritzner

==== Results by match ====
Round	1	2	3	4	5	6	7	8	9	10	11	12	13	14	15	16	17	18	19	20	21	22	23	24	25	26
Result	L	W	L	L	W	L	D	W	L	L	W	L	L	D	L	W	W	W	D	L	L	W	W	W	L	W
Position	14	9	9	11	8	11	11	8	9	11	8	10	12	12	12	11	10	9	9	11	11	10	9	9	9	10

Updated to match(es) played on 15 October 1955. Source: 2 Dear Points
W = Win; D = Draw; L = Loss

=== 1955–56 Liga Leumit ===
==== Final table ====
Pos	Club	P	W	D	L	GF	GA	GR	Pts	
7	Beitar Tel Aviv	22	10	0	12	42	44	0.95	20	
8	Maccabi Netanya	22	9	2	11	31	44	0.70	20	
9	Hapoel Ramat Gan	22	9	0	13	28	42	0.67	18	
10	Maccabi Jaffa	22	6	5	11	39	48	0.81	17	Promotion/relegation play-offs
11	Maccabi Rehovot	22	6	1	15	25	64	0.39	13	Relegated to Liga Alef

==== Matches ====
3 December 1955 1	Hapoel Ramat Gan	0–1	Hapoel Tel Aviv	Givatayim
			32' Rosenbaum	Stadium: Hamakhtesh Stadium; Attendance: 2,500; Referee: Sher

10 December 1955 2	Maccabi Rehovot	1–2	Hapoel Ramat Gan	Rehovot
	Litvak 66' (pen.)		41' Chronsich; 88' (pen.) Kirschenberg	Stadium: Maccabi Ground; Attendance: 1,500; Referee: Nahman Cohen

17 December 1955 3	Hapoel Ramat Gan	1–0	Hapoel Haifa	Givatayim
	Kirschenberg 76' (pen.)			Stadium: Hamakhtesh Stadium; Attendance: 1,800; Referee: Dudkevich

24 December 1955 4	Maccabi Tel Aviv	1–0	Hapoel Ramat Gan	Tel Aviv
	Nahmias 88'			Stadium: Basa Stadium; Attendance: 5,000; Referee: Moshe Cohen

31 December 1955 5	Hapoel Ramat Gan	0–3	Maccabi Petah Tikva	Givatayim
			47' (o.g.) Manar; 74', 82' Nadel	Stadium: HaMakhtesh Stadium; Attendance: 2,000; Referee: Werner

7 January 1956 6	Hapoel Petah Tikva	3–0	Hapoel Ramat Gan	Petah Tikva
	Mizrahi 27'; Stelmach 46'; Kofman 60'	Report		Stadium: Hapoel Ground; Attendance: 2,500; Referee: Yunes

14 January 1956 7	Maccabi Jaffa	2–1	Hapoel Ramat Gan	Tel Aviv
	Herschkovitz 32'; B. Cohen 55'		19' Pulaver	Stadium: Maccabi Jaffa Ground; Referee: Sher

21 January 1956 8	Hapoel Ramat Gan	0–3	Beitar Tel Aviv	Givatayim
			6' (pen.) Elmaliah; 23', 60' Bar Zion	Stadium: HaMakhtesh Stadium; Attendance: 2,500; Referee: Cohen

11 February 1956 9	Hapoel Ramat Gan	4–2	Maccabi Netanya	Givatayim
	Chronsich 17', 60'; I. Kirschenberg 30' (pen.); Radler 70'		46' Shrager; 72' I. Caspi	Stadium: HaMakhtesh Stadium; Referee: Hillman

18 February 1956 10	Hapoel Kfar Saba	1–2	Hapoel Ramat Gan	Kfar Saba
	H. Glazer 74' (pen.)		63' (pen.) I. Kirschenberg; 65' Kofetz	Stadium: Hapoel Ground; Referee: Ben-Rubi

25 February 1956 11	Hapoel Ramat Gan	0–1	Maccabi Haifa	Givatayim
			36' Hardy	Stadium: HaMakhtesh Stadium; Referee: Fritzner

3 March 1956 12	Hapoel Tel Aviv	2–0	Hapoel Ramat Gan	Tel Aviv
	Michaelov 60', 73'			Stadium: Basa Stadium; Attendance: 1,500; Referee: Hoze

10 March 1956 13	Hapoel Ramat Gan	3–2	Maccabi Rehovot	Givatayim
	Mesika 11'; Kirschenberg 33'; Migdalovich 54'		23' (pen.) Litvak; 43' Lieber	Stadium: HaMakhtesh Stadium; Referee: Hillman

17 March 1956 14	Hapoel Haifa	2–3	Hapoel Ramat Gan	Haifa
	Martin 26' (pen.); Nestenfober 57'		15' Mesika; 60' Migdalovich; 86' Kirschenberg	Stadium: Kiryat Eliezer Stadium; Referee: Werner

24 March 1956 15	Hapoel Ramat Gan	1–0	Maccabi Tel Aviv	Givatayim
	Kirschenberg 54'			Stadium: HaMakhtesh Stadium; Referee: Ben-Rubi

31 March 1956 16	Maccabi Petah Tikva	3–1	Hapoel Ramat Gan	Petah Tikva
	Nadel 5'; Turkenitz 36'; Spiegel 55'		7' Kirschenberg	Stadium: Maccabi Ground; Referee: Sher

7 April 1956 17	Hapoel Ramat Gan	2–5	Hapoel Petah Tikva	Givatayim
	Mesika 19'; Kirschenberg 60'		6' Kofman; 37', 72' Stelmach; 42' Ratzabi; 55' Varon	Stadium: HaMakhtesh Stadium; Referee: Werner

14 April 1956 18	Hapoel Ramat Gan	2–5	Maccabi Jaffa	Givatayim
	Mesika 50'; Kirschenberg 88'		21', 22', 31' B. Cohen; 33' Kalev; 60' Aroyo	Stadium: HaMakhtesh Stadium; Referee: Dudkevitch

22 April 1956 19	Beitar Tel Aviv	1–0	Hapoel Ramat Gan	Tel Aviv
	Elmaliah 37'			Stadium: Maccabi Jaffa Ground; Attendance: 3,000; Referee: Werner

19 May 1956 20	Maccabi Netanya	0–3	Hapoel Ramat Gan	Netanya
			32' Rozin; 37' R. Cohen; 41' Tsalala	Stadium: Sar-Tov Stadium; Attendance: 1,500; Referee: Schwartz

27 May 1956 21	Hapoel Ramat Gan	3–1	Hapoel Kfar Saba	Givatayim
	Tsalala 10'; Chronsich 15'; Kirschenberg 25' (pen.)		50' Tzahobel	Stadium: HaMakhtesh Stadium; Referee: Klein

2 June 1956 22	Maccabi Haifa	3–0	Hapoel Ramat Gan	Haifa
	S. Levi 32'; Menchel 38'; Hardy 65'			Stadium: Kiryat Eliezer Stadium; Referee: Werner

==== Results by match ====
Round	1	2	3	4	5	6	7	8	9	10	11	12	13	14	15	16	17	18	19	20	21	22
Result	L	W	W	L	L	L	L	L	W	W	L	L	W	W	W	L	L	L	L	W	W	L
Position	12	7	5	7	8	9	11	12	10	9	10	11	9	9	9	9	9	9	8	9	9	8

Updated to match(es) played on 28 July 1956. Source: IFA
W = Win; D = Draw; L = Loss

=== State Cup ===
27 August 1955 QF	Maccabi Petah Tikva	0–1 (a.e.t.)	Hapoel Ramat Gan	Petah Tikva
		Report (p. 8)	119' (o.g.) Buch	Stadium: Hapoel Ground; Attendance: 2,000; Referee: Markovich

22 October 1955 SF	Hapoel Petah Tikva	2–0	Hapoel Ramat Gan	Tel Aviv
	Chirik 32'; Stelmach 86'	Report (p. 8)		Stadium: Basa Stadium; Attendance: 2,500; Referee: Sher

=== Netanya 25th Anniversary Cup ===
In October and November, while the promotion playoffs and the State Cup were being played, two cup competitions were organized by Liga Leumit Clubs, the second edition of the Shapira Cup, and the Netanya 25th Anniversary Cup. Hapoel Ramat Gan, Hapoel Ramat Gan, Hapoel Ramat Gan and Hapoel Ramat Gan took part in the competition, dedicated to the 25th anniversary of Netanya.

==== Table ====
Pos	Team	Pld	W	D	L	GF	GA	GR	Pts	Qualification
1	Maccabi Petah Tikva	3	2	1	0	14	5	2.800	5	Winners
2	Hapoel Ramat Gan	3	1	1	1	8	7	1.143	3	
3	Maccabi Netanya	3	1	1	1	5	7	0.714	3	
4	Beitar Tel Aviv	3	0	1	2	7	15	0.467	1	

Source: Hadshot HaSport, p. 1

29 October 1955 1	Hapoel Ramat Gan	5–2	Beitar Tel Aviv	Givatayim
	Chronsich 3', 78'; Kirschenberg 11' (pen.), 69', 73'	Report (p. 8)	20' Osherov; 57' Emaliah	Stadium: HaMakhtesh Stadium; Attendance: 2,500; Referee: Metzler

5 November 1955 2	Maccabi Netanya	3–1	Hapoel Ramat Gan	Petah Tikva
	I. Caspi 10', 51'; Orenstein , 79'	Report (p. 8)	, 9' Mordechovich	Stadium: Maccabi Ground; Attendance: 1,500; Referee: Zahavi

12 November 1955 3	Hapoel Ramat Gan	2–2	Maccabi Petah Tikva	Netanya
	I. Ben-Dror 43'; Levkovich 81'	Report (p. 8)	52' Radler; 67' Chronsich	Stadium: Sar-Tov Stadium; Attendance: 2,000; Referee: Rosenbaum
