= 1954–55 Hapoel Petah Tikva F.C. season =

Hapoel Petah Tikva
1954–55 season
- Manager: Moshe Varon
- Stadium: Hapoel Ground, Petah Tikva
- Liga Alef: not completed
- State Cup: not completed
- Top goalscorer: League: Nahum Stelmach (14); All: Nahum Stelmach (18)

The 1954–55 Hapoel Petah Tikva season was the club's 20th season since its establishment in 1935, and 7th since the establishment of the State of Israel.

During the season, the club competed in Liga Alef (top division) and the State Cup. In addition, the team took part in a joint tour to Cyprus with Maccabi Petah Tikva.

== Review and events ==
- On 24 September 1954, a team of players from both Hapoel Petah Tikva and Maccabi Petah Tikva departed for a tour of Cyprus, without the consent of the IFA. The Hapoel organization sent a telegram forbidding the participation of Hapoel players in any match, and the team played as Maccabi Petah Tikva. The team played against APOEL FC, AC Omonia and Çetinkaya, losing two matches and drawing one. After returning to Israel, Maccabi Petah Tikva was banned for 6 months for its part of the tour, while Hapoel Petah Tikva received a fine of 50 pounds.
- Petah Tikva XI, a team composed of players from Hapoel Petah Tikva and Maccabi Petah Tikva played three matches against visiting foreign teams: Against Beşiktaş on 20 September 1954, losing 0–2, against Udarnik Sofia on 16 October 1954, losing 2–3, and against AC Omonia on 27 May 1955, winning 4–1. Players of the club were also part of a Hapoel XI team which played Beşiktaş on 22 September 1954, winning 3–1 and Udarnik Sofia on 10 October 1954, losing 0–3.

== Match Results ==
=== Legend ===
Win Draw Loss

=== Liga Alef ===
League matches began on 6 February 1955, and by the time the season, only 20 rounds of matches were completed, delaying the end of the league season to the next season.

==== League table (as of 2 July 1955) ====
Pos	Club	P	W	D	L	GF	GA	GR	Pts
1	Maccabi Tel Aviv	20	14	3	3	68	20	3.40	31
2	Hapoel Petah Tikva	20	13	4	3	38	15	2.53	30
3	Hapoel Tel Aviv	20	9	8	3	37	17	2.18	26
4	Beitar Tel Aviv	20	9	5	6	48	36	1.33	23
5	Maccabi Petah Tikva	20	8	6	6	27	24	1.13	22

==== Matches ====
5 February 1955 1	Maccabi Petah Tikva	0–1	Hapoel Petah Tikva	Petah Tikva
		Report (p. 8)	20' Stelmach	Stadium: Maccabi Ground; Attendance: 1,500; Referee: Sher

12 February 1955 2	Hapoel Petah Tikva	1–1	Hapoel Kfar Saba	Petah Tikva
	Segal 68'	Report (p. 8)	55' H. Glazer	Stadium: Hapoel Ground; Attendance: 1,800; Referee: Levinger

19 February 1955 3	Hapoel Ramat Gan	0–1	Hapoel Petah Tikva	Givatayim
		Report (p. 8)	88' Kofman	Stadium: HaMakhtesh Stadium; Attendance: 1,500; Referee: Rosenbaum

26 February 1955 4	Maccabi Netanya	0–3 (w/o) (abandoned)	Hapoel Petah Tikva	Netanya
	Hosias 18'	Report (p. 8)	3' (pen.) Kofman; 42' Zelikovich; 80' Stelmach	Stadium: Sar-Tov Stadium; Attendance: 2,000; Referee: Dudkevich

5 March 1955 5	Hapoel Petah Tikva	2–1	Maccabi Tel Aviv	Petah Tikva
	Stelmach 3'; Kofman 42'	Report (p. 8)	12' Glazer	Stadium: Hapoel Ground; Attendance: 3,500; Referee: Levichter

12 March 1955 6	Hapoel Petah Tikva	4–0	Beitar Tel Aviv	Petah Tikva
	Chirik 4', 49'; Stelmach 84'; Kofman 87'	Report (p. 8)		Stadium: Hapoel Ground, Petah Tikva; Attendance: 1,500; Referee: Fried

19 March 1955 7	Maccabi Haifa	1–3	Hapoel Petah Tikva	Haifa
	E. Fuchs 81'	Report	3', 80' Stelmach; 61' Zelikovich	Stadium: Kiryat Haim Stadium; Attendance: 4,000; Referee: Werner

1 April 1955 8	Hapoel Petah Tikva	2–0	Beitar Jerusalem	Petah Tikva
	Zelikovich 21'; Segal 85'			Stadium: Hapoel Ground; Attendance: 1,500; Referee: Klein

9 April 1955 9	Hapoel Hadera	0–3	Hapoel Petah Tikva	Hadera
		Report (p. 8)	46' Mizrahi; 41' Chirik; 80' Zelikovich	Stadium: Hapoel Ground; Attendance: 1,500; Referee: Frizner

13 April 1955 10	Hapoel Balfouria	1–5	Hapoel Petah Tikva	Afula
	Tal 74'	Report (p. 4)	13' Haldi; 56' Chirik; 60' Kofman; 73', 76' Stelmach	Stadium: Hapoel Ground; Attendance: 800; Referee: Harap

16 April 1955 11	Hapoel Petah Tikva	3–1	Hapoel Haifa	Petah Tikva
	Stelmach 34', 67'; Chirik 53'	Report (p. 8)	63' (pen.) Martin	Stadium: Hapoel Ground; Attendance: 2,500; Referee: Rosenbaum

23 April 1955 12	Maccabi Rehovot	1–3	Hapoel Petah Tikva	Rehovot
	Jamil 35'	Report (p. 8)	11' Kofman; 36' Stelmach; 64' (o.g.) Melamed	Stadium: Maccabi Ground; Attendance: 2,000; Referee: Dudkevich

30 April 1955 13	Hapoel Petah Tikva	1–0	Hapoel Tel Aviv	Petah Tikva
	Kofman 82'	Report (p. 8)		Stadium: Hapoel Ground; Attendance: 4,500; Referee: Werner

14 May 1955 14	Hapoel Petah Tikva	1–1	Maccabi Petah Tikva	Petah Tikva
	Kofman 68'	Report (p. 8)	1' A. Carmeli	Stadium: Hapoel Ground; Attendance: 5,000; Referee: Frizner

21 May 1955 15	Hapoel Kfar Saba	0–1	Hapoel Petah Tikva	Kfar Saba
		Report (p. 8)	57' Stelmach	Stadium: Hapoel Ground; Attendance: 3,000; Referee: Parnas

4 June 1955 16	Hapoel Petah Tikva	0–2	Hapoel Ramat Gan	Petah Tikva
		Report (p. 8)	38' Chronsich; 86' Tsalala	Stadium: Hapoel Ground; Attendance: 3,000; Referee: Hillman

11 June 1955 17	Hapoel Petah Tikva	1–1	Maccabi Netanya	Petah Tikva
	Stelmach 82'	Report (p. 8)	22' I. Caspi	Stadium: Hapoel Ground; Attendance: 1,500; Referee: Scheindling

18 June 1955 18	Maccabi Tel Aviv	2–1	Hapoel Petah Tikva	Tel Aviv
	Israeli 33'; Glazer 43'	Report (p. 8)	17' Stelmach	Stadium: Basa Stadium; Attendance: 8,000; Referee: Frizner

26 June 1955 19	Beitar Tel Aviv	2–1	Hapoel Petah Tikva	Tel Aviv
	Elmaliah 14'; Huli 52'	Report (p. 8)	53' Stelmach	Stadium: Basa Stadium; Attendance: 5,000; Referee: Werner

3 July 1955 20	Hapoel Petah Tikva	1–1	Maccabi Haifa	Petah Tikva
	Y. Vissoker 15' (pen.)	Report	75' Held	Stadium: Hapoel Ground; Attendance: 2,000; Referee: Rosenbaum

==== Results by match ====
Match	1	2	3	4	5	6	7	8	9	10	11	12	13	14	15	16	17	18	19	20
Result	W	D	W	W	W	W	W	W	W	W	W	W	W	D	W	L	D	L	L	D
Position	3	4	4	3	1	1	1	1	1	1	1	1	1	1	1	1	1	1	2	2

Updated to match(es) played on 3 July 1955. Source: 2 Dear Points
W = Win; D = Draw; L = Loss

=== State Cup ===
26 March 1955 Round 3	Hapoel Petah Tikva	5–1	Maccabi Jaffa	Petah Tikva
	Kofman 33' (pen.), 85', 89'; Stelmach 65', 79'		64' Harama	Stadium: Hapoel Ground; Attendance: 4,000; Referee: Sher

28 May 1955 Round 4	Hapoel Petah Tikva	7–0	Hapoel Nahariya	Petah Tikva
	Zelikovich 6', 46'; Stelmach 10', 78'; Kofman 45', 80'; Markus 56'			Stadium: Hapoel Ground; Attendance: 700; Referee: Ben-Rubi

10 July 1955 Int. Round	Hapoel Petah Tikva	w/o	Hapoel Balfouria	Petah Tikva
				Stadium: Hapoel Ground
