= Zvi Markus =

Israeli footballer

Personal information
- Full name: Zvika Markus
- Date of birth: November 5, 1938 (age 87)
- Place of birth: Tel Aviv, Israel
- Position: Right wing

Youth career
- 1948 –1955: Hapoel Petah Tikva

Senior career*
Years	Team	Apps	(Gls)
1955–1964	Hapoel Petah Tikva	44	(11)
1964–1966	Hapoel Kfar Saba	32	(2)
- * Club domestic league appearances and goals

Zvi (Zvika) Markus (Hebrew: צביקה מרכוס or צביקה מרקוס) is a former Israeli footballer who played for Hapoel Petah Tikva and Hapoel Kfar Saba.

== Career ==
Born in Tel Aviv to football referee Moshe Markus, Zvika moved with his family to Petah Tikva in 1948, where he joined Hapoel Petah Tikva. In 1955 Markus was promoted to the first team, and was part of the championship winning team in 1954–55, scoring his first goal for the team in a cup match against Hapoel Nahariya, and a hat-trick in a league match against Hapoel Balfouria. On 21 April 1956, in a league match against Hapoel Tel Aviv Markus was injured, which took over a year to recover from, returning to the team at the beginning of the 1958–59 season.

Markus stayed with Hapoel Petah Tikva until the end of the 1963–64 season, winning five championships with the team. At the beginning of the 1964–65 Markus transferred to Hapoel Kfar Saba, with which he played in Liga Alef (second division) for the next two seasons, retiring at the end of the 1965–66 season.

== Personal life ==
Markus is married to Carmela Bek, daughter of Haim and Rachel Bek, owners of Pitu'ach Hotel in Ra'anana. The two met while Markus was staying at the hotel with Hapoel Petah Tikva ahead of the 1954–55 Israel State Cup final, Bek was 10 years old at the time. When Bek reached the age of 18, she contacted Markus through a footballer who moved from Hapoel Petah Tikva to Hapoel Ra'anana, and the two later married and had three children.

== Honours ==
- Israeli Premier League (6):
  - 1954–55, 1958–59, 1959–60, 1960–61, 1961–62, 1962–63
- Israel Super Cup (1)
  - 1961–62 (shared)
