= 1954–55 Hapoel Ramat Gan F.C. season =

Hapoel Ramat Gan
1954–55 season
- Manager: Emmanuel Spector; Monia Goshen
- Stadium: HaMakhtesh Stadium
- Liga Alef: not completed
- State Cup: not completed
- Top goalscorer: League: Shlomo Chronsich; Yosef Kurik; Arie Radler (3); All: Shlomo Chronsich (6)

The 1954–55 Hapoel Ramat Gan season was the club's 29th season since its establishment in 1927, and 7th since the establishment of the State of Israel.

During the season, the club competed in Liga Alef (top division) and the State Cup.

== Match Results ==
=== Legend ===
Win Draw Loss

=== Liga Alef ===
League matches began on 6 February 1955, and by the time the season, only 20 rounds of matches were completed, delaying the end of the league season to the next season.

==== League table (as of 2 July 1955) ====
Pos	Club	P	W	D	L	GF	GA	GR	Pts
9	Maccabi Rehovot	20	7	4	9	35	37	0.95	18
10	Hapoel Haifa	20	6	6	8	31	35	0.89	18
11	Hapoel Ramat Gan	20	7	3	10	23	27	0.85	17
12	Beitar Jerusalem	20	5	5	10	27	47	0.57	15
13	Hapoel Hadera	20	6	2	12	24	37	0.65	14

==== Matches ====
5 February 1955 1	Hapoel Ramat Gan	0–3	Beitar Tel Aviv	Givatayim
		Report (p. 8)	20' Elmaliah; 23' Gleit; 47' Huli	Stadium: HaMakhtesh Stadium; Attendance: 1,500; Referee: Werner

12 February 1955 2	Maccabi Haifa	1–3	Hapoel Ramat Gan	Haifa
	Frankfurter 28'	Report	50' Schtalzer; 61', 71' Manar	Stadium: Kiryat Haim Stadium; Attendance: 2,000; Referee: Reuven Frisner

19 February 1955 3	Hapoel Ramat Gan	0–1	Hapoel Petah Tikva	Givatayim
		Report (p. 8)	88' Kofman	Stadium: HaMakhtesh Stadium; Attendance: 1,500; Referee: Rosenbaum

26 February 1955 4	Hapoel Hadera	2–0	Hapoel Ramat Gan	Hadera
	Piterman 47'; Weinberg 89' (pen.)	Report (p. 8)		Stadium: Hapoel Ground; Attendance: 2,000; Referee: Levichter

5 March 1955 5	Hapoel Ramat Gan	6–0	Hapoel Balfouria	Givatayim
	Chechik 13', 70'; Kurik 41'; Menasherov 46', 76'; Pulaver 75'	Report (p. 8)		Stadium: HaMakhtesh Stadium; Attendance: 1,800; Referee: Stern

12 March 1955 6	Hapoel Haifa	2–0	Hapoel Ramat Gan	Haifa
	Kramer 1', 59'	Report (p. 8)		Stadium: Kiryat Haim Stadium; Attendance: 1,500; Referee: Zahavi

19 March 1955 7	Hapoel Ramat Gan	0–0	Maccabi Rehovot	Givatayim
		Report (p. 8)		Stadium: HaMakhtesh Stadium; Attendance: 2,000; Referee: Rosenbaum

2 April 1955 8	Hapoel Ramat Gan	1–0	Hapoel Tel Aviv	Givatayim
	Fritzner 52'			Stadium: HaMakhtesh Stadium; Attendance: 1,500; Referee: Parnas

9 April 1955 9	Maccabi Petah Tikva	1–0	Hapoel Ramat Gan	Petah Tikva
	Turkenitz 67' (pen.)	Report (p. 8)		Stadium: Maccabi Ground; Attendance: 3,500; Referee: Cohen

13 April 1955 10	Hapoel Kfar Saba	1–0	Hapoel Ramat Gan	Kfar Saba
	H. Glazer 34'	Report (p. 4)		Stadium: Hapoel Ground; Attendance: 2,500; Referee: Dudkevich

16 April 1955 11	Hapoel Ramat Gan	3–1	Beitar Jerusalem	Givatayim
	Kurik 19', 79'; Kirschenberg 90' (pen.)	Report (p. 8)	Yehezkel 65'	Stadium: HaMakhtesh Stadium; Attendance: 2,000; Referee: Yonas

23 April 1955 12	Hapoel Ramat Gan	0–3	Maccabi Netanya	Givatayim
		Report (p. 8)	33', 67' H. Meller; 78' M. Cohen	Stadium: HaMakhtesh Stadium; Attendance: 2,000; Referee: Scheindling

30 April 1955 13	Maccabi Tel Aviv	6–0	Hapoel Ramat Gan	Tel Aviv
	Glazer 9', 24', 29', 38'; Israeli 33'; Dobrin 67'	Report (p. 8)		Stadium: Basa Stadium; Attendance: 4,000; Referee: Levichter

14 May 1955 14	Beitar Tel Aviv	1–1	Hapoel Ramat Gan	Tel Aviv
	Elmaliah 24'	Report (p. 8)	12' Radler	Stadium: Basa Stadium; Attendance: 3,500; Referee: Sher

21 May 1955 15	Hapoel Ramat Gan	0–1	Maccabi Haifa	Givatayim
		Report	47' Held	Stadium: HaMakhtesh Stadium; Attendance: 2,000; Referee: Dudkevich

4 June 1955 16	Hapoel Petah Tikva	0–2	Hapoel Ramat Gan	Petah Tikva
		Report (p. 8)	38' Chronsich; 86' Tsalala	Stadium: Hapoel Ground; Attendance: 3,000; Referee: Hillman

11 June 1955 17	Hapoel Ramat Gan	2–0	Hapoel Hadera	Givatayim
	Fon 46' (o.g.); Chronsich 67'	Report (p. 8)		Stadium: HaMakhtesh Stadium; Attendance: 1,500; Referee: Rosenbaum

18 June 1955 18	Hapoel Balfouria	1–3	Hapoel Ramat Gan	Afula
	Zahavi 47'	Report (p. 8)	17' Radler; 35' Chronsich; 70' Tsalala	Stadium: Hapoel Ground; Attendance: 500; Referee: Sher

26 June 1955 19	Hapoel Ramat Gan	2–2	Hapoel Haifa	Givatayim
	Radler 25'; Kirschenberg 58' (pen.)	Report (p. 8)	1' Orbach; 26' (pen.) Neumann	Stadium: HaMakhtesh Stadium; Attendance: 1,500; Referee: Markovich

3 July 1955 20	Maccabi Rehovot	1–0	Hapoel Ramat Gan	Rehovot
	Litvak 64'	Report (p. 8)		Stadium: Maccabi Ground; Attendance: 1,600; Referee: Werner

==== Results by match ====
Match	1	2	3	4	5	6	7	8	9	10	11	12	13	14	15	16	17	18	19	20
Result	L	W	L	L	W	L	D	W	L	L	W	L	L	D	L	W	W	W	D	L
Position	14	9	9	11	8	11	11	8	9	11	8	10	12	12	12	11	10	9	9	11

Updated to match(es) played on 3 July 1955. Source: 2 Dear Points
W = Win; D = Draw; L = Loss

=== State Cup ===
26 March 1955 Round 3	Hapoel Ramat Gan	3–0	Hapoel Bnei Brak/Kiryat Ono	Givatayim
	Chronsich 10', 80'; Migdalovich 62'			Stadium: HaMakhtesh Stadium; Attendance: 600; Referee: Gaon

28 May 19545 Round 4	Hapoel Ramat Gan	2–1	Maccabi Netanya	Givatayim
	Y. Spiegel 39' (o.g.); Chronsich 86'		11' (pen.) I. Caspi	Stadium: HaMakhtesh Stadium; Attendance: 1,500; Referee: Harap
