= Nahum Stelmach =

Israeli footballer and manager

Nahum Stelmach נחום סטלמך
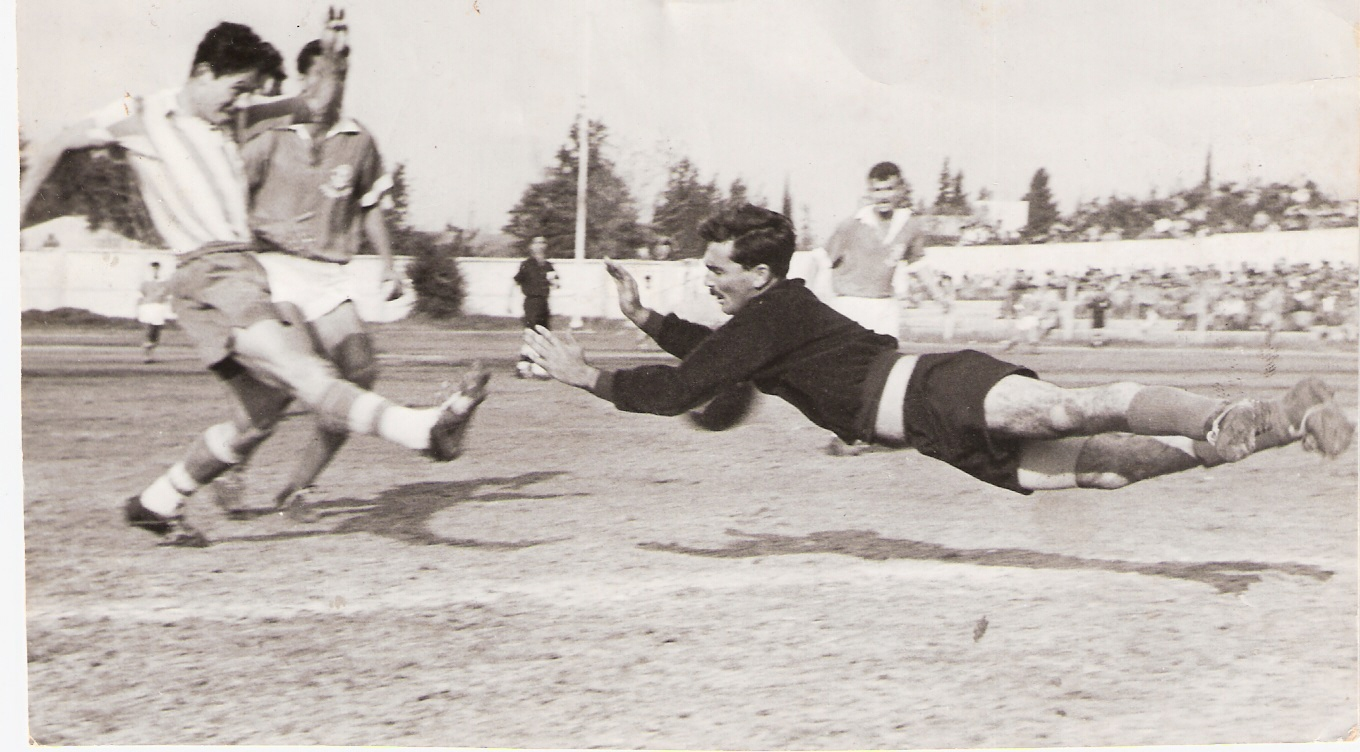
- Stelmach (left) with Yochanan Vollach in 1959

Personal information
- Full name: Nahum Stelmach
- Date of birth: July 19, 1936
- Place of birth: Petah Tikva, British Mandate of Palestine (now Israel)
- Date of death: March 27, 1999 (aged 62)
- Position: Right forward

Senior career*
Years	Team	Apps	(Gls)
1951–1969	Hapoel Petah Tikva	349	(154)
1969–1970	Bnei Yehuda	18	(4)
1970	Hapoel Herzliya F.C.	1	(1)
Total		368	(159)

International career
1956–1968	Israel	61	(22)

Managerial career
- 1967–1969: Hapoel Petah Tikva (Player-manager)
- 1987–1988: Hapoel Petah Tikva (General Manager)
- 1999: Israel
Medal record
Men's football
Representing Israel
AFC Asian Cup
Winner	1964 Israel
Runner-up	1956 Hong Kong
Runner-up	1960 South Korea
- * Club domestic league appearances and goals

Nahum Stelmach (Hebrew: נחום סטלמך; July 19, 1936 – March 27, 1999) was an Israeli footballer and manager.

== Biography ==
Stelmach was born in Petah Tikva, British Mandate of Palestine (now Israel), to a Jewish family. He was chosen third by Yediot Aharonot's greatest Israeli footballers. He made a name for himself as the leader of Hapoel Petah Tikva. At the height of his career in Hapoel Petah Tikva, Stelmach received offers to sign for Arsenal and Fenerbahçe but declined due to his loyalty to the team. He led his team to five national championships, four of them consecutive.

His most recognizable attribute was the quality of his headers, with which he scored most of his international goals. As a result, he was commonly nicknamed "the golden head" in Israel.

He scored what was arguably his most famous goal for the Israel national team in an Olympic qualifier against The USSR, with Lev Yashin as goalkeeper at the Ramat Gan Stadium on 1956. Despite the fact that Israel lost the game 2:1 (his goal was a temporary equalizer), and that the game was not televised, that goal is widely considered a defining moment in the history of Israel's national team's early years.

== Coach ==
He was the trainer of Hapoel Haifa in the 1970s, while training the international stars Yochanan Vollach and Itzhak Englander.

== Honors ==
Hapoel Petah Tikva

- National league: 1954–55, 1958–59, 1959–60, 1960–61, 1961–62, 1962–63
- Israel State Cup: 1956–57

Israel

- AFC Asian Cup: 1964; Runner-up, 1956, 1960
