= Boaz Kofman =

Israeli footballer and manager

Boaz Kofman בועז קופמן

Personal information
- Full name: Boaz Kofman
- Date of birth: 29 March 1935
- Place of birth: Petah Tikva, Israel
- Date of death: 31 August 2016 (aged 81)
- Position: Striker

Youth career
- 1944–1953: Hapoel Petah Tikva

Senior career*
Years	Team	Apps	(Gls)
1953–1968	Hapoel Petah Tikva	310	(121)
1968–1969	Sektzian Ness Ziona		
1969–1970	Hapoel Petah Tikva	0	(0)
1970	Beitar Tel Aviv		
1970–1971	Beitar Lod		

International career
1956–1965	Israel	8	(1)

Managerial career
- 1968–1969: Sektzia Ness Ziona
- 1970–1971: Beitar Lod
- 1971–1972: Hapoel Mahane Yehuda
- 1973–1975: Hapoel Petah Tikva
- 1976–1977: Hapoel Petah Tikva
- 1978: Hapoel Ashdod
- Maccabi Sha'arayim
- Hapoel Lod
- 1982: Hapoel Petah Tikva
Medal record
Men's football
Representing Israel
AFC Asian Cup
Runner-up	1956 Hong Kong
- * Club domestic league appearances and goals

Boaz Kofman (Hebrew: בועז קופמן, 1935-2016) was an Israeli football manager who played for Hapoel Petah Tikva, where he also served as manager, and for the Israel national football team.

== Career ==
=== Playing career ===
Kofman joined Hapoel Petah Tikva at the age of 9 and graduated to the senior team in 1953, where he played until the end of the 1966–68 season, winning 6 league titles and one cup. During his Time with the club, Kofman scored 121 league goals and 29 cup goals, including scoring in three cup finals. After Kofman's departure from Hapoel Petah Tikva, he served as player-manager at Sektzia Ness Ziona for one season, before returning to Hapoel Petah Tikva at the beginning of the 1969–70 season. However, Kofman didn't play during the first half of the season, and in February 1970, Kofman was transferred to Beitar Tel Aviv Kofman retired from active play in 1971, after a season at Beitar Lod, where he served as player-manager.

In 1956, Kofman made his debut for Israel, in an Olympic qualifying match against USSR. Kofman played a total of 8 matches for the national team, scoring one goal, against Cyprus, in 1960.

=== Managing career ===
Kofman started his coaching career with stints as player-manager at Sektzia Ness Ziona and Beitar Lod, and, after retiring from active play, in 1971, Kofman served as manager for Hapoel Mahane Yehuda. In 1973, Kofman replaced Rehavia Rozenboim as head coach at Hapoel Petah Tikva, where he led the club to the 1974 cup final, in which the team lost to Hapoel Haifa. Kofman left Hapoel Petah Tikva at the end of the 1973–74 season, but returned to the club later in the next season, as a replacement manager, in an effort to save the club from relegation to Liga Artzit, which proved unsuccessful. Kofman guided the club during its first season in Liga Artzit, and left the coaching position at the end of the season, after failing to gain promotion back to Liga Leumit. Kofman returned for a third spell in Hapoel Peath Tikva as a replacement manager during the 1981–82 season, but didn't manage to save the club from relegating.

== Honours ==
Hapoel Petah Tikva

- Israeli Premier League: 1954–55, 1958–59, 1959–60, 1960–61, 1961–62, 1962–63
- Israel State Cup: 1957
- Israel Super Cup: 1961–62 (shared)

Israel

- AFC Asian Cup: Runner-up, 1956
