= 1985–86 Toto Cup Artzit =

Israeli second tier football league cup

Toto Cup Artzit
- Season: 1985–86
- Champions: Hapoel Hadera

The 1985–86 Toto Cup Artzit was the 2nd season of the second tier League Cup (as a separate competition) since its introduction.

It was held in two stages. First, the 16 Liga Artzit teams were divided into four groups. The group winners advanced to the semi-finals, which, as was the final, were held as one-legged matches.

The competition was won by Hapoel Hadera, who had beaten Hapoel Acre 3–2 in the final.

== Group stage ==
=== Group A ===
Pos	Team	Pld	W	D	L	GF	GA	GD	Pts	HHD	BTA	HMK	BHA
1	Hapoel Hadera (A)	6	3	3	0	13	4	+9	12	—	1–1	3–0	1–1
2	Beitar Tel Aviv	6	3	1	2	11	8	+3	10	1–2	—	2–1	3–1
3	Hapoel Marmorek	6	2	1	3	8	8	0	7	1–1	0–2	—	3–0
4	Beitar Haifa	6	2	1	3	5	17	−12	7	0–5	3–2	0–3	—

Source: Toto Cup Leumit 1985-86 (in Hebrew)
Rules for classification: 1st points; 2nd goal difference; 3rd matches won; 4th goals scored; 5th head-to-head; 6th decision match
(A) Advanced to semifinals

=== Group B ===
Pos	Team	Pld	W	D	L	GF	GA	GD	Pts	HTZ	BNT	HTI	HLD
1	Hapoel Tzafririm Holon (A)	6	4	1	1	14	5	+9	13	—	2–2	4–0	1–0
2	Beitar Netanya	6	3	2	1	13	7	+6	11	0–1	—	2–0	4–1
3	Hapoel Tiberias	6	1	2	3	7	13	−6	5	3–2	2–2	—	0–0
4	Hapoel Lod	6	1	1	4	5	14	−9	4	0–4	1–3	3–2	—

Source: Toto Cup Leumit 1985-86 (in Hebrew)
Rules for classification: 1st points; 2nd goal difference; 3rd matches won; 4th goals scored; 5th head-to-head; 6th decision match
(A) Advanced to semifinals

=== Group C ===
Pos	Team	Pld	W	D	L	GF	GA	GD	Pts	HMR	HRG	MRA	HBE
1	Hakoah Amidar Ramat Gan (A)	6	3	2	1	11	6	+5	11	—	0–0	2–0	1–1
2	Hapoel Ramat Gan	6	2	3	1	7	6	+1	9	3–2	—	1–1	0–0
3	Maccabi Ramat Amidar	6	2	2	2	13	7	+6	8	0–1	2–1	—	9–1
4	Hapoel Beit Shemesh	6	0	3	3	6	18	−12	3	2–5	1–2	1–1	—

Source: Toto Cup Leumit 1985-86 (in Hebrew)
Rules for classification: 1st points; 2nd goal difference; 3rd matches won; 4th goals scored; 5th head-to-head; 6th decision match
(A) Advanced to semifinals

=== Group D ===
Pos	Team	Pld	W	D	L	GF	GA	GD	Pts	HAC	HRH	HYD	BRL
1	Hapoel Acre (A)	6	3	2	1	13	7	+6	11	—	4–1	2–1	3–0
2	Hapoel Ramat HaSharon	6	3	1	2	6	6	0	10	2–1	—	0–0	1–0
3	Hapoel Yehud	6	2	2	2	8	6	+2	8	1–1	0–2	—	3–1
4	Beitar Ramla	6	1	1	4	4	12	−8	4	2–2	1–0	0–3	—

Source: Toto Cup Leumit 1985-86 (in Hebrew)
Rules for classification: 1st points; 2nd goal difference; 3rd matches won; 4th goals scored; 5th head-to-head; 6th decision match
(A) Advanced to semifinals

== Elimination rounds ==
=== Semifinals ===
21 January 1986	Hapoel Hadera	1–0	Hakoah Ramat Gan	Netanya
14:00	Abu Mukh 85'	Report (in Hebrew)		Stadium: Beitar Netanya ground Attendance: 200; Referee: Yosef Grossman

21 January 1986	Hapoel Tzafririm Holon	1–4	Hapoel Acre	Hadera
14:00	Penso 88'	Report (in Hebrew)	Ben Amo 10', 25'; Ohana 40'; Vaknin 70'	Stadium: Hapoel Hadera ground Attendance: 100; Referee: Ovadia Tzvi

=== Final ===
22 April 1986
15:30

Hapoel Hadera	3–2	Hapoel Acre
Shapira 41', 77', 89'	Report (in Hebrew)	Ohana 29', 57'

Ramat Gan Stadium
Attendance: 200
Referee: Itzhak Yachbas

== See also ==
- 1985–86 Toto Cup Leumit
