= Moshe Poliakov =

Israeli footballer and manager (1910–1975)

Moshe Poliakov משה פוליאקוב
Personal information
- Full name: Moshe Poliakov
- Date of birth: 1910
- Place of birth: Russia
- Date of death: 3 March 1975 (aged 64–65)
- Place of death: Israel
- Position: Centre-back

Senior career*
Years	Team	Apps	(Gls)
1924–1934	Hapoel Tel Aviv	42	(5)

Managerial career
- 1934–1947: Hapoel Tel Aviv
- 1947–1953: Hapoel Petah Tikva
- 1954–1955: Hapoel Tel Aviv
- 1955–1956: Hapoel Kfar Saba
- 1956–1957: Hapoel Jerusalem
- 1957–1959: Hapoel Holon
- * Club domestic league appearances and goals

Moshe (Mosta) Poliakov (Hebrew: משה (מוסטה) פוליאקוב) was an Israeli footballer and manager, one of the founders of Hapoel Tel Aviv and the first captain of the club, and one of the most decorated coaches in Israeli football.

== Biography ==
Poliakov was born in Russian Empire in 1910, and immigrated to Palestine in 1922 with his family. At the age of only 14, he was one of the founders of the Tel Aviv "Allenby Team", together with his brother, Shlomo Poliakov. This team joined forces with the Hapoel Tel Aviv team in 1927, and Poliakov was the first captain of the united team. He played in the team as a defender together with his brother, and scored 5 goals in 42 appearances in the recorded games. In 1928 Hapoel Tel Aviv won the first cup of the Land of Israel, The People's Cup.

In 1934 Poliakov retired from active playing and began managing Hapoel Tel Aviv. Under his guidance, the team won five championships and four Israel Cups while completing two doubles. Poliakov coached the "Hapoel team" on their trip to the United States in 1947, and the "IDF team" on a tour of Cyprus in 1952. In the following years he coached Hapoel Petah Tikva, Hapoel Kfar Saba, Hapoel Jerusalem and Hapoel Holon.

Concurrently with his football career, Poliakov worked in the surveying department of Ma'atz starting in 1929.

Poliakov died on 3 March 1975 from a heart attack at his home in Tel Aviv and left behind a wife. Actor Yisrael (Poly) Poliakov, the son of Shlomo Poliakov, and diplomat Eviatar Manor are his nephews.

== Honours ==
As a Hapoel Tel Aviv player

- State Cups (1): 1928

As manager of Hapoel Tel Aviv

- championships (5): 1933/1934, 1934/1935, 1938, 1940, 1943/1944
- State Cups (4): 1934, 1937, 1938, 1939
