= Aharon Amar =

Israeli footballer

Aharon Amar אהרון אמר
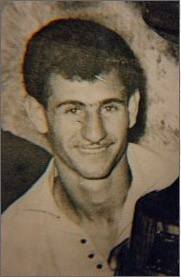

Personal information
- Date of birth: 1 January 1937 (age 89)
- Place of birth: Casablanca, French protectorate in Morocco

Senior career*
Years	Team	Apps	(Gls)
	Maccabi Haifa	132	(35)

International career
1958–1961	Israel	14	(0)
- * Club domestic league appearances and goals

Aharon Amar (Hebrew: אהרון אמר), is a former Israeli footballer for Maccabi Haifa.

== Sports career ==
Amar was discovered by Haifa, when word of mouth got around that a local kibbutz had a new immigrant that was an amazing footballer. After scouts saw him play, he was immediately signed and enjoyed immediate success with the Greens.

This led to Amar being called up to the Israel national football team, where he played in the win over Yugoslavia. He played 14 times for Israel between 1958 and 1961.

He scored a league record seventeen goals in the 1958–59 Liga Leumit season. He was the last Maccabi Haifa player to top the league goalscoring until Zahi Armeli scored 25 goals in 1987–88.
