= Shlomo Nahari =

Israeli footballer

Shlomo Nahari שלמה נהרי
Personal information
- Date of birth: 17 October 1934 (age 92)
- Place of birth: Ra'anana, Israel
- Height: 1.83 m (6 ft 0 in)
- Position: Midfielder

Senior career*
Years	Team	Apps	(Gls)
1952	Hapoel Ra'anana		
1956–1965	Hapoel Petah Tikva	161	(69)

International career
1958–1961	Israel	12	(2)
- * Club domestic league appearances and goals

Shlomo Nahari (Hebrew: שלמה נהרי; born 17 October 1934) is an Israeli footballer. He played in twelve matches for the Israel national football team from 1958 to 1961.
