= Zion Digmi =

Israeli footballer

Zion Digmi ציון דגמי
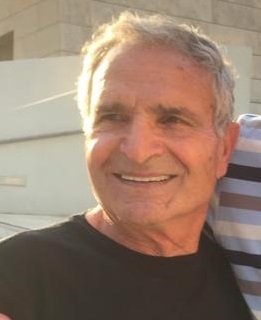

Personal information
- Full name: Zion Digmi
- Date of birth: May 8, 1942 (age 84)
- Place of birth: Amarah, Iraq
- Position: Goalkeeper

Youth career
- 2008–2016: Maccabi Jaffa

Senior career*
Years	Team	Apps	(Gls)
1958–1970	Maccabi Jaffa	282	(1)
1971–1974	Hapoel Ramat Gan		
1974–1981	Shimshon Tel Aviv		
1981–1984	Maccabi Jaffa		

International career
1962–1968	Israel	3	(0)
- * Club domestic league appearances and goals

Zion Digmi (Hebrew: ציון דגמי; born May 8, 1942) is a former Israeli footballer. He competed in the men's tournament at the 1968 Summer Olympics.
