= 1985–86 Toto Cup Leumit =

Toto Cup Leumit
- Season: 1985–86
- Champions: Hapoel Petah Tikva

The 1985–86 Toto Cup Leumit was the second season of the third most important football tournament in Israel since its introduction.

It was held in two stages. First, the 16 Liga Leumit teams were divided into four groups. The group winners advanced to the semi-finals, which, as was the final, were held as one-legged matches. The first stage of the competition was played between 5 October 1985 and 9 November 1985, while the national team was competing in the 1986 World Cup qualification.

The competition was won by Hapoel Petah Tikva, who had beaten Hapoel Be'er Sheva 2–1 in the final.

== Group stage ==
The matches were played from 5 October to 9 November 1985.

=== Group A ===
Pos	Team	Pld	W	D	L	GF	GA	GD	Pts	HBS	MHA	HHA	HTA
1	Hapoel Be'er Sheva (A)	6	4	0	2	9	7	+2	12	—	3–1	3–1	1–0
2	Maccabi Haifa	6	3	0	3	7	9	−2	9	3–1	—	1–0	2–1
3	Hapoel Haifa	6	2	1	3	7	7	0	7	2–0	2–0	—	1–1
4	Hapoel Tel Aviv	6	2	1	3	6	6	0	7	0–1	2–0	2–1	—

Source: Toto Cup Leumit 1985-86 (in Hebrew)
Rules for classification: 1st points; 2nd goal difference; 3rd matches won; 4th goals scored; 5th head-to-head; 6th decision match
(A) Advanced to semifinals

=== Group B ===
Pos	Team	Pld	W	D	L	GF	GA	GD	Pts	HPT	MYA	BEI	BNY
1	Hapoel Petah Tikva (A)	6	3	1	2	6	4	+2	10	—	2–1	1–2	1–0
2	Maccabi Yavne	6	2	2	2	4	5	−1	8	0–2	—	1–0	1–1
3	Beitar Jerusalem	6	2	2	2	4	5	−1	8	1–0	0–0	—	0–0
4	Bnei Yehuda	6	1	3	2	4	4	0	6	0–0	0–1	3–1	—

Source: Toto Cup Leumit 1985-86 (in Hebrew)
Rules for classification: 1st points; 2nd goal difference; 3rd matches won; 4th goals scored; 5th head-to-head; 6th decision match
(A) Advanced to semifinals

=== Group C ===
Pos	Team	Pld	W	D	L	GF	GA	GD	Pts	MTA	HKS	STA	MSH
1	Maccabi Tel Aviv (A)	6	3	3	0	12	8	+4	12	—	3–3	1–0	3–1
2	Hapoel Kfar Saba	6	2	3	1	10	9	+1	9	1–2	—	1–0	2–2
3	Shimshon Tel Aviv	6	1	3	2	7	6	+1	6	1–1	1–1	—	2–2
4	Maccabi Sha'arayim	6	0	3	3	8	14	−6	3	2–2	1–2	0–3	—

Source: Toto Cup Leumit 1985-86 (in Hebrew)
Rules for classification: 1st points; 2nd goal difference; 3rd matches won; 4th goals scored; 5th head-to-head; 6th decision match
(A) Advanced to semifinals

=== Group D ===
Pos	Team	Pld	W	D	L	GF	GA	GD	Pts	MNE	MJF	MPT	HJE
1	Maccabi Netanya (A)	6	2	4	0	11	4	+7	10	—	6–0	0–0	2–2
2	Maccabi Jaffa	6	2	3	1	6	8	−2	9	0–0	—	1–1	1–1
3	Maccabi Petah Tikva	6	1	3	2	5	5	0	6	0–1	0–2	—	0–0
4	Hapoel Jerusalem	6	0	4	2	6	11	−5	4	2–2	0–2	1–4	—

Source: Toto Cup Leumit 1985-86 (in Hebrew)
Rules for classification: 1st points; 2nd goal difference; 3rd matches won; 4th goals scored; 5th head-to-head; 6th decision match
(A) Advanced to semifinals

== Elimination rounds ==
=== Semifinals ===
21 January 1986	Maccabi Tel Aviv	1–2	Hapoel Be'er Sheva	Ramat Gan
14:30	Natan 64'	Report (in Hebrew)	Sultan 14'; Weizmann 62'	Stadium: Ramat Gan Stadium; Attendance: 1000; Referee: Rahamim Dinachi

21 January 1986	Hapoel Petah Tikva	1–0	Maccabi Netanya	Ramat Gan
16:30	Hazan 30'	Report (in Hebrew)		Stadium: Ramat Gan Stadium; Attendance: 300; Referee: Haim Lipkovich

=== Final ===
22 April 1986
17:30

Hapoel Petah Tikva	2–1	Hapoel Be'er Sheva
Nahari 31'; Hazan 51'	Report (in Hebrew)	Shoshani 78' (pen.)

Ramat Gan Stadium
Attendance: 500
Referee: Itzhak Orgad

== See also ==
- 1985–86 Toto Cup Artzit
