= Arie Radler =

Israeli footballer

Arie Radler אריה רדלר
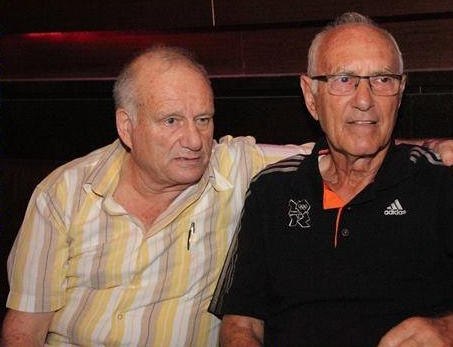

Personal information
- Full name: Arie Radler
- Date of birth: April 15, 1937 (age 89)
- Place of birth: Moldova, USSR
- Date of death: 2 August 2016 (aged 79)
- Position: Defender

Youth career
- Hapoel Pardes Hanna

Senior career*
| Years | Team | Apps | (Gls) |
| 1955–1956 | Hapoel Ramat Gan | | |
| 1956–1964 | Hapoel Petah Tikva | 119 | (2) |
| 1965 | Hapoel Kfar Saba | 4 | (0) |

Managerial career
- 1965–1969: Hapoel Kfar Saba
- 1969–1970: Maccabi Petah Tikva
- 1970–1971: Bnei Yehuda
- 1971–1972: Beitar Jerusalem
- 1972–1974: Maccabi Netanya
- 1974–1975: Hapoel Petah Tikva
- 1975–1976: Hapoel Hadera
- 1976–1977: Maccabi Jaffa
- 1978–1979: Hakoah Ramat Gan
- 1980–1981: Beitar Jerusalem
- Beitar Tel Aviv
- 1989–1992: Maccabi Ironi Ashdod
- * Club domestic league appearances and goals

Arie Radler (Hebrew: אריה רדלר) is a former Israeli footballer and manager.

== Honours ==
=== As a Player ===
- Israeli championships
  - Winner (5): 1958–59, 1959–60, 1960–61, 1961–62, 1962–63
  - Runner-up (3): 1955–56, 1956–57, 1957–58
- State Cup
  - Winner (1): 1957
  - Runner-up (2): 1959, 1961
- Israeli Supercup
  - Winner (1): 1962
  - Runner-up (1): 1957

=== As a Manager ===
- Israeli championships
  - Winner (1): 1973–74
  - Runner-up (1): 1971–72
- Liga Alef
  - Runner-up (1): 1989–90
