= 1991–92 Israel State Cup =

Tournament details
- Country: Israel

Final positions
- Champions: Hapoel Petah Tikva (2nd title)
- Runners-up: Maccabi Tel Aviv

The 1991–92 Israel State Cup (Hebrew: גביע המדינה, Gvia HaMedina) was the 53rd season of Israel's nationwide football cup competition and the 38th after the Israeli Declaration of Independence.

The competition was won by Hapoel Petah Tikva who have beaten Maccabi Tel Aviv 3–1 in the final.

The winner, Hapoel Petah Tikva, qualified to the 1992–93 European Cup Winners' Cup, entering in the qualifying round.

== Results ==
=== Round of 16 ===
Team 1	Agg.	Team 2	1st leg	2nd leg
Maccabi Netanya	2–2 (5–4 p)	Maccabi Ironi Ashdod	0–2	2–0
Maccabi Petah Tikva	3–1	Hapoel Tiberias	0–0	3–1
Hapoel Tel Aviv	1–0	Bnei Yehuda	1–0	0–0
Maccabi Yavne	2–1	Hapoel Tzafririm Holon	1–0	1–1
Hapoel Petah Tikva	4–0	Hapoel Ashkelon	1–0	3–0
Maccabi Tel Aviv	2–1	Hapoel Be'er Sheva	1–1	1–0
Maccabi Haifa	5–1	Hapoel Ramat Gan	1–1	4–0
Beitar Tel Aviv	8–2	Maccabi Sektzia Ma'alot	5–2	3–0

=== Quarter-finals ===
Team 1	Agg.	Team 2	1st leg	2nd leg
Beitar Tel Aviv	6–2	Maccabi Yavne	4–1	2–1
Maccabi Haifa	5–2	Maccabi Petah Tikva	3–0	2–2
Maccabi Tel Aviv	6–1	Hapoel Tel Aviv	3–0	3–1
Hapoel Petah Tikva	2–2 (a)	Maccabi Netanya	1–0	1–2

=== Semi-finals ===
Home team	Score	Away team
Maccabi Tel Aviv	4–2	Maccabi Haifa
Hapoel Petah Tikva	1–0 (a.e.t.)	Beitar Tel Aviv

=== Final ===
9 June 1992

Maccabi Tel Aviv	1–3 (a.e.t.)	Hapoel Petah Tikva
Cohen 40'		Mahpud 16'; Bason 101', 107'

Ramat Gan Stadium
Attendance: 15000
Referee: Prost
