= Ronen Shapira =

Israeli footballer

Ronen Shapira רונן שפירא
Personal information
- Date of birth: 1967 (age 58–59)
- Place of birth: Hadera, Israel

Youth career
- 1973–1983: Hapoel Hadera

Senior career*
Years	Team	Apps	(Gls)
1983–1989	Hapoel Hadera		
1989–1995	Maccabi Netanya	97	(14)
1995–1996	Hapoel Hadera		
- * Club domestic league appearances and goals

Ronen Shapira (Hebrew: רונן שפירא) is a former Israeli footballer who is mostly known for playing in the early 1990s in Maccabi Netanya.

He made his debut in the senior side of Hapoel Hadera while only 15 years old.

== Honours ==
- Toto Cup (Artzit):
  - Winner (2): 1985–86, 1988–89
