= Eli Mahpud =

Israeli footballer and manager

Eli Mahpud אלי מחפוד
Personal information
- Date of birth: 25 March 1961 (age 65)
- Place of birth: Petah Tikva, Israel
- Position: Midfielder

Team information
- Current team: Maccabi Sha'arayim (Manager)

Youth career
- Hapoel Petah Tikva

Senior career*
Years	Team	Apps	(Gls)
1979–1993	Hapoel Petah Tikva	281	(16)

Managerial career
- 2007–2009: Hapoel Petah Tikva
- 2009: Maccabi Ahi Nazareth
- 2009–2010: Hapoel Petah Tikva
- 2011–2012: Hapoel Ashkelon
- 2012–2013: Hapoel Petah Tikva
- 2015: Maccabi Kabilio Jaffa
- 2016: Hapoel Jerusalem
- 2016: Maccabi Sha'arayim
- * Club domestic league appearances and goals

Eli Mahpud (Hebrew: אלי מחפוד; born 25 March 1961) is an Israeli former association football player and manager.

== Career ==
Mahpud spent two spells as manager of Hapoel Petah Tikva, first leading them to promotion from the Liga Leumit in 2008 before being dismissed in 2009, then reappointed in December 2009 only to quit his post ten months later. Between these appointments he led Maccabi Ahi Nazareth to promotion to the Israeli Premier League before leaving the club bottom of that league.

== Honours ==
- Israel State Cup (1):
  - 1992
- Toto Cup (3):
  - 1985–86, 1989–90, 1990–91
