= 1962–63 Liga Leumit =

Liga Leumit
- Season: 1962–63
- Champions: Hapoel Petah Tikva; 6th title
- Top goalscorer: Zecharia Ratzabi (12)

The 1962–63 Liga Leumit season saw Hapoel Petah Tikva crowned champions for the fifth successive season, a record which remains unbeaten. Hapoel's Zecharia Ratzabi was the league's top scorer with 12 goals.

No club was relegated at the end of the season, as the league was expanded to 15 clubs the following season.

== Match fixing allegations and Sarig Committee ==
During the season, several cases of match fixing were rumored to happen, most notably after a match played on 16 March 1963 between Maccabi Jaffa and Maccabi Petah Tikva (in which Maccabi Petah Tikva won 3–1), prior to which an attempt was made to bribe Jaffa goalkeeper Zion Digmi to let Petah Tikva score. Following the match, IFA president, Arie Sarig, established a committee, with himself as its chairman, to look into the alleged fixed matches, including poor performances by Maccabi Haifa during the team's matches against Maccabi Tel Aviv and Maccabi Petah Tikva, accusations against IFA board member from Hapoel faction, Menachem Heller, that he acted to have the referee for the match between Maccabi Petah Tikva and Hapoel Haifa switched and alleged bribery attempt accusations against Hapoel Haifa player Ziggy Blum in the same match.

The Sarig Committee ruling, given after the end of the season, ruled that the match between Maccabi Jaffa and Maccabi Petah Tikva was fixed and that the match result should be recorded as a 0–0 with no points given. The committee also banned Maccabi Petah Tikva footballer Yeshayahu Alon for life for the attempted bribery and rejected all other complaints filed to it. The ruling deducted two points from Maccabi Petah Tikva, and the club dropped to 12th place and faced relegation. The club turned to the civil Tel Aviv District Court, claiming that not only the committee's ruling is wrong, but that Sarig was acting out of his jurisdiction in establishing the committee.

On 14 July 1963, Judge Yosef-Michael Lamm ruled that the Sarig Committee was established without jurisdiction and that its ruling is void. The ruling re-instated Maccabi Petah Tikva's victory over Maccabi Jaffa and elevated the club back to 10th place, relegating Hapoel Haifa to Liga Alef. Following the ruling, the IFA considered its action, eventually choosing not to relegate any team and to play the next season with 15 clubs. In February 1964, the lifetime ban given to Yeshayahu Alon was lifted.

== Final table ==
Pos	Team	Pld	W	D	L	GF	GA	GD	Pts
1	Hapoel Petah Tikva	22	13	6	3	38	17	+21	32
2	Hapoel Tel Aviv	22	9	9	4	31	16	+15	27
3	Maccabi Jaffa	22	10	4	8	36	27	+9	24
4	Shimshon Tel Aviv	22	9	6	7	32	33	−1	24
5	Bnei Yehuda	22	9	4	9	30	33	−3	22
6	Hapoel Jerusalem	22	9	3	10	21	24	−3	21
7	Maccabi Tel Aviv	22	7	7	8	22	26	−4	21
8	Hapoel Tiberias	22	8	4	10	26	29	−3	20
9	Maccabi Haifa	22	7	5	10	36	41	−5	19
10	Maccabi Petah Tikva	22	7	5	10	22	31	−9	19
11	Hakoah Ramat Gan	22	5	8	9	20	31	−11	18
12	Hapoel Haifa	22	6	5	11	20	26	−6	17

Source: Source

== Results ==
Home \ Away	BnY	HAR	HHA	HJE	HPT	HTA	HTI	MHA	MJA	MPT	MTA	STA
Bnei Yehuda	—	3–0	1–1	0–3	2–1	1–5	2–0	3–1	1–3	2–0	1–2	3–2
Hakoah Ramat Gan	3–1	—	1–4	1–0	1–1	0–3	1–0	2–3	1–0	3–1	0–0	1–2
Hapoel Haifa	0–0	0–0	—	2–0	2–0	0–3	0–2	0–0	1–2	2–0	1–0	1–3
Hapoel Jerusalem	2–0	0–0	1–0	—	1–2	2–3	2–0	1–0	1–0	1–0	1–0	0–0
Hapoel Petah Tikva	2–1	1–1	1–0	3–1	—	1–0	3–0	7–1	0–1	1–0	0–0	1–1
Hapoel Tel Aviv	2–2	0–0	3–0	1–0	0–0	—	3–1	1–1	2–2	0–0	1–0	0–0
Hapoel Tiberias	1–2	2–0	1–2	1–0	0–3	1–2	—	2–0	2–1	5–0	2–2	2–1
Maccabi Haifa	2–0	4–2	2–1	2–2	2–2	0–0	1–2	—	2–4	3–0	6–1	2–0
Maccabi Jaffa	1–0	3–1	2–1	0–1	1–2	2–1	1–1	4–2	—	0–0	1–1	6–1
Maccabi Petah Tikva	1–3	0–0	1–1	3–1	1–2	1–0	1–1	2–1	1–0	—	3–1	1–1
Maccabi Tel Aviv	0–1	0–0	1–0	3–1	0–3	0–0	2–0	1–0	1–1	2–0	—	2–3
Shimshon Tel Aviv	1–1	3–2	2–1	3–0	1–2	2–1	0–0	4–1	1–0	0–2	1–3	—

Legend: Blue = home team win; Yellow = draw; Red = away team win.
