= 1960–61 Liga Leumit =

Annual soccer tournament

Liga Leumit
- Season: 1960–61
- Champions: Hapoel Petah Tikva; 4th title
- Relegated: Beitar Tel Aviv
- Top goalscorer: Zecharia Ratzabi; Shlomo Levi (15)

The 1960–61 Liga Leumit season saw Hapoel Petah Tikva crowned champions for the third successive season. Hapoel's Zecharia Ratzabi and Hapoel Haifa's Shlomo Levi were the joint top scorers with 15 goals each.

Beitar Tel Aviv were relegated to Liga Alef.

== Final table ==
Pos	Team	Pld	W	D	L	GF	GA	GD	Pts	Relegation
1	Hapoel Petah Tikva	22	16	4	2	48	15	+33	36	
2	Hapoel Tel Aviv	22	14	2	6	38	20	+18	30	
3	Hapoel Haifa	22	12	5	5	44	25	+19	29	
4	Maccabi Tel Aviv	22	12	2	8	34	29	+5	26	
5	Maccabi Haifa	22	11	3	8	40	33	+7	25	
6	Maccabi Jaffa	22	10	3	9	27	28	−1	23	
7	Hapoel Jerusalem	22	9	3	10	29	26	+3	21	
8	Shimshon Tel Aviv	22	6	8	8	18	29	−11	20	
9	Maccabi Petah Tikva	22	6	4	12	23	31	−8	16	
10	Maccabi Netanya	22	6	2	14	19	33	−14	14	
11	Bnei Yehuda	22	4	5	13	20	38	−18	13	
12	Beitar Tel Aviv	22	5	1	16	17	50	−33	11	Relegated to Liga Alef

Source: rsssf.com

== Results ==
Home \ Away	BTA	BnY	HHA	HJE	HPT	HTA	MHA	MJA	MNE	MPT	MTA	STA
Beitar Tel Aviv	—	3–0	2–1	0–3	0–3	0–6	2–1	3–2	2–1	1–4	0–3	1–3
Bnei Yehuda	3–0	—	1–3	1–1	1–1	0–2	2–2	0–2	1–1	0–2	3–5	0–1
Hapoel Haifa	2–0	0–1	—	2–1	1–2	2–1	4–1	4–1	3–0	0–0	2–1	5–0
Hapoel Jerusalem	2–1	1–1	0–0	—	0–2	0–4	2–1	0–1	5–0	2–1	2–3	0–1
Hapoel Petah Tikva	5–0	2–0	3–0	2–0	—	4–0	0–2	3–2	2–0	4–2	2–0	2–2
Hapoel Tel Aviv	2–1	3–0	2–5	1–0	0–2	—	3–1	2–0	4–0	1–0	1–1	0–0
Maccabi Haifa	3–0	5–3	3–3	0–3	1–0	1–0	—	3–0	1–0	2–0	2–1	4–1
Maccabi Jaffa	1–0	2–0	1–1	2–1	1–1	0–1	2–0	—	1–0	2–1	0–3	3–0
Maccabi Netanya	2–0	0–1	2–3	0–1	0–2	0–1	3–0	1–0	—	2–1	3–0	0–0
Maccabi Petah Tikva	2–1	0–2	0–0	1–2	1–3	1–2	1–5	1–2	1–0	—	0–0	3–0
Maccabi Tel Aviv	1–0	1–0	1–2	2–1	0–1	1–0	3–2	2–1	4–3	0–1	—	1–0
Shimshon Tel Aviv	0–0	1–0	2–1	0–2	2–2	1–2	0–0	1–1	0–1	0–0	3–1	—

Legend: Blue = home team win; Yellow = draw; Red = away team win.
