= HaMakhtesh Stadium =

Stadium in Givatayim, Israel

Coordinates: 32°04′43.75″N 34°48′38.52″E

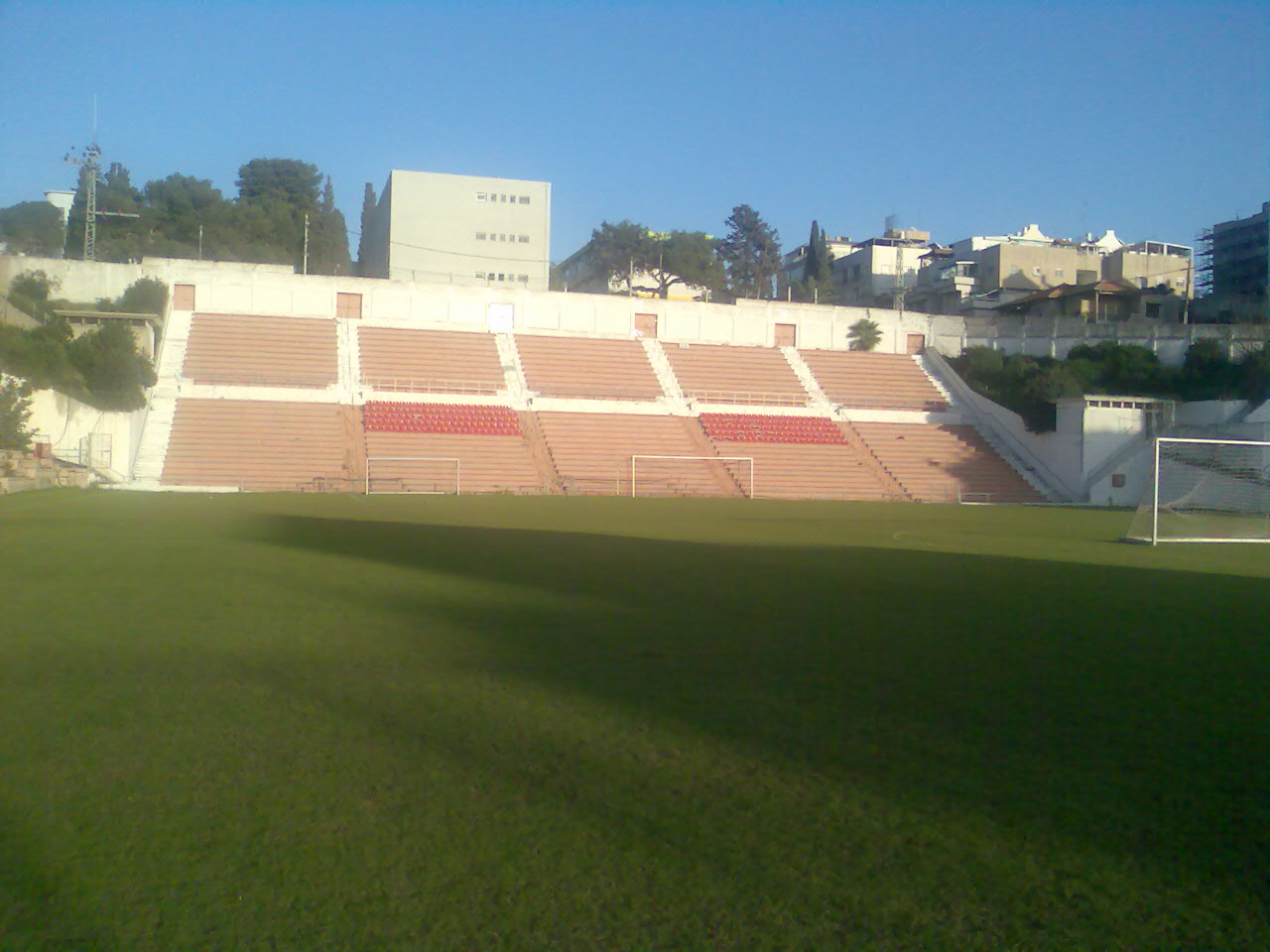
- Interactive map of HaMakhtesh Stadium
- Location: Givatayim, Tel Aviv District, Israel
- Capacity: 5,500

Construction
- Opened: 1927
- Renovated: 2007
- Expanded: 2007
- Closed: 2009
- Demolished: 2010

Tenant
- Hapoel Ramat Gan (until 2009)

The HaMakhtesh Stadium (Hebrew: אצטדיון המכתש, Etztadion HaMakhtesh) was a stadium in the Tel Aviv District city of Givatayim, Israel, and the home of Hapoel Ramat Gan. The name "HaMakhtesh" translates into English as "The Crater".

The stadium was originally opened in 1927 and nowadays has an all-seated capacity of 5,500. There were only two stands; one behind a goal and the other alongside the pitch. The record attendance was 9,000 for the championship-deciding match between Hapoel Ramat Gan and Hapoel Petah Tikva on 28 March 1964, which was won by the home side.

Despite Hapoel playing in the UEFA Cup in the 2003–04 UEFA Cup, the stadium has never witnessed European football, as due to a UEFA ban on matches being played in Israel because of security concerns, Hapoel Ramat Gan home match against Levski Sofia was played in Dunajská Streda, Slovakia.
