= Moshe Varon =

Israeli footballer (1926–2007)

Moshe Varon משה וארון
Personal information
- Date of birth: 3 January 1926
- Place of birth: Bulgaria
- Date of death: 18 December 2007 (aged 81)
- Position: Forward

Youth career
- –1941: Hapoel Petah Tikva

Senior career*
Years	Team	Apps	(Gls)
1941–1956	Hapoel Petah Tikva	68	(35)

International career
1949	Israel	3	(0)

Managerial career
- 1953–1956: Hapoel Petah Tikva (player-manager)
- 1956–1958: Hapoel Ramat Gan
- 1958: Israel
- Beitar Jerusalem
- Maccabi Petah Tikva
- Hapoel Jerusalem
- Maccabi Jaffa
- * Club domestic league appearances and goals

Moshe Varon (Hebrew: משה וארון; 3 January 1926 – 18 December 2007) was an Israeli football player and manager.

== Honours ==
=== As a player-manager ===
- Israeli Premier League: 1955
