= Zecharia Ratzabi =

Israeli footballer

Zecharia Ratzabi זכריה רצאבי
Personal information
- Date of birth: 29 May 1934
- Date of death: 10 October 2005 (aged 71)

International career
Years	Team	Apps	(Gls)
1958–1962	Israel	11	(2)

Zecharia Ratzabi (Hebrew: זכריה רצאבי; 29 May 1934 – 10 October 2005) was an Israeli footballer. He played in eleven matches for the Israel national football team from 1958 to 1962.
