= 1961–62 Liga Leumit =

Liga Leumit
- Season: 1961–62
- Champions: Hapoel Petah Tikva; 5th title
- Relegated: Maccabi Netanya
- Top goalscorer: Yitzhak Nizri; Shlomo Levi (16)

The 1961–62 Liga Leumit season saw Hapoel Petah Tikva crowned as champions for the fourth successive season (a record which no other club has yet repeated). Shlomo Levi of Hapoel Haifa and Yitzhak Nizri of Hapoel Tiberias were the league's joint top scorers with 16 goals each.

Maccabi Netanya were relegated to Liga Alef.

== Final table ==
Pos	Team	Pld	W	D	L	GF	GA	GD	Pts	Relegation
1	Hapoel Petah Tikva	22	12	4	6	35	19	+16	28	
2	Maccabi Jaffa	22	10	6	6	33	29	+4	26	
3	Hapoel Tiberias	22	11	3	8	43	31	+12	25	
4	Maccabi Haifa	22	11	3	8	45	34	+11	25	
5	Bnei Yehuda	22	9	6	7	32	29	+3	24	
6	Hapoel Jerusalem	22	8	7	7	26	25	+1	23	
7	Hapoel Tel Aviv	22	10	3	9	31	35	−4	23	
8	Hapoel Haifa	22	8	6	8	34	27	+7	22	
9	Shimshon Tel Aviv	22	8	6	8	24	28	−4	22	
10	Maccabi Tel Aviv	22	5	7	10	22	34	−12	17	
11	Maccabi Petah Tikva	22	5	6	11	14	30	−16	16	
12	Maccabi Netanya	22	4	5	13	23	41	−18	13	Relegated to Liga Alef

Source: rsssf.com

== Results ==
Home \ Away	BnY	HHA	HJE	HPT	HTA	HTI	MHA	MJA	MNE	MPT	MTA	STA
Bnei Yehuda	—	0–5	2–1	0–0	2–1	0–0	2–0	5–1	4–0	2–0	1–1	2–0
Hapoel Haifa	0–3	—	0–0	0–1	3–3	1–1	2–0	1–1	1–0	0–1	5–3	1–1
Hapoel Jerusalem	3–1	1–0	—	2–1	1–2	0–2	1–2	2–2	3–0	2–0	1–0	0–0
Hapoel Petah Tikva	3–0	2–1	2–0	—	1–2	3–0	2–3	1–2	5–0	0–0	1–1	1–0
Hapoel Tel Aviv	0–0	2–1	2–2	0–3	—	4–2	0–2	4–0	1–0	2–1	3–0	0–2
Hapoel Tiberias	3–2	1–2	3–1	2–0	4–0	—	3–2	1–1	4–1	2–0	4–1	5–0
Maccabi Haifa	1–1	3–1	0–1	2–3	2–0	2–1	—	1–2	2–0	0–0	4–1	1–3
Maccabi Jaffa	3–0	2–1	2–0	0–1	1–2	4–2	2–2	—	1–1	1–0	2–0	0–1
Maccabi Netanya	2–0	1–2	2–2	1–2	5–0	0–2	4–7	1–2	—	0–0	1–0	3–1
Maccabi Petah Tikva	1–2	0–3	1–1	1–0	0–2	1–0	3–7	1–3	0–0	—	2–0	1–0
Maccabi Tel Aviv	2–1	1–1	1–1	1–2	1–0	3–0	1–0	0–0	1–0	1–1	—	2–2
Shimshon Tel Aviv	2–2	0–2	0–1	1–1	2–1	2–1	1–2	2–1	0–0	2–0	2–1	—

Legend: Blue = home team win; Yellow = draw; Red = away team win.
