= 1958–59 Liga Leumit =

Liga Leumit
- Season: 1958–59
- Champions: Hapoel Petah Tikva; 2nd title
- Relegated: Hapoel Kfar Saba
- Top goalscorer: Aharon Amar (17)

The 1958–59 Liga Leumit season took place between November 1958 and May 1959. Hapoel Petah Tikva won the title, while Hapoel Kfar Saba, who had finished bottom the previous season (in which there was no relegation), were relegated to Liga Alef. Aharon Amar of Maccabi Haifa was the league's top scorer with 17 goals.

== Final table ==
Pos	Team	Pld	W	D	L	GF	GA	GD	Pts	Qualification or relegation
1	Hapoel Petah Tikva	22	15	3	4	49	18	+31	33	Champions
2	Hapoel Haifa	22	13	5	4	46	23	+23	31	
3	Maccabi Tel Aviv	22	13	4	5	38	19	+19	30	
4	Maccabi Haifa	22	14	1	7	47	24	+23	29	
5	Maccabi Jaffa	22	10	4	8	33	28	+5	24	
6	Maccabi Petah Tikva	22	10	3	9	27	30	−3	23	
7	Hapoel Tel Aviv	22	6	7	9	29	32	−3	19	
8	Hapoel Ramat Gan	22	6	7	9	26	36	−10	19	
9	Maccabi Netanya	22	7	5	10	22	36	−14	19	
10	Hapoel Jerusalem	22	5	6	11	17	32	−15	16	
11	Beitar Tel Aviv	22	2	9	11	20	47	−27	13	
12	Hapoel Kfar Saba	22	3	2	17	21	50	−29	8	Relegated to Liga Alef

Source: rsssf.com

== Results ==
Home \ Away	BTA	HHA	HJE	HKS	HPT	HRG	HTA	MHA	MJA	MNE	MPT	MTA
Beitar Tel Aviv	—	1–6	1–2	1–1	2–2	3–1	3–3	1–6	0–3	1–1	0–0	0–4
Hapoel Haifa	4–1	—	2–1	2–1	1–1	0–1	1–1	3–1	6–0	4–1	1–0	0–1
Hapoel Jerusalem	1–1	0–0	—	2–1	0–2	1–0	2–4	1–2	1–1	1–2	2–1	0–0
Hapoel Kfar Saba	0–1	2–5	1–0	—	1–3	2–2	0–4	1–2	0–3	2–1	1–3	1–0
Hapoel Petah Tikva	2–0	1–2	1–0	6–0	—	3–0	3–0	4–1	3–0	5–1	1–0	4–0
Hapoel Ramat Gan	1–1	1–1	1–1	3–1	1–3	—	0–0	0–3	3–2	2–0	0–2	3–2
Hapoel Tel Aviv	2–2	0–2	0–0	3–2	2–1	1–1	—	1–2	3–1	0–2	0–2	2–2
Maccabi Haifa	2–0	4–1	0–2	1–0	3–0	5–0	1–0	—	2–2	5–0	1–0	0–1
Maccabi Jaffa	1–0	5–0	5–0	1–0	0–1	2–0	0–2	2–1	—	1–0	0–2	1–1
Maccabi Netanya	3–0	0–2	1–0	2–1	1–1	1–1	2–1	2–1	0–0	—	1–1	0–3
Maccabi Petah Tikva	2–1	0–0	1–0	3–2	3–1	0–5	2–0	1–3	0–2	3–1	—	1–4
Maccabi Tel Aviv	0–0	0–3	5–0	2–1	0–1	2–0	1–0	2–1	3–1	1–0	4–0	—

Legend: Blue = home team win; Yellow = draw; Red = away team win.
