= 1959–60 Liga Leumit =

Liga Leumit
- Season: 1959–60
- Champions: Hapoel Petah Tikva; 3rd title
- Relegated: Hapoel Ramat Gan
- Top goalscorer: Rafi Levi (19)

The 1959–60 Liga Leumit season took place between September 1959 and June 1960. Hapoel Petah Tikva won their second consecutive title, whilst Hapoel Ramat Gan were relegated. Rafi Levi of Maccabi Tel Aviv was the league's top scorer with 19 goals.

The league used two points for a win and one for a draw.

== Final table ==
| Pos | Team | Pld | W | D | L | GF | GA | GD | Pts | Qualification or relegation |
|---|---|---|---|---|---|---|---|---|---|---|
| 1 | Hapoel Petah Tikva | 22 | 14 | 3 | 5 | 65 | 29 | +36 | 31 | Champions |
| 2 | Maccabi Tel Aviv | 22 | 12 | 6 | 4 | 52 | 35 | +17 | 30 | |
| 3 | Hapoel Haifa | 22 | 10 | 6 | 6 | 46 | 24 | +22 | 26 | |
| 4 | Hapoel Jerusalem | 22 | 9 | 7 | 6 | 28 | 27 | +1 | 25 | |
| 5 | Maccabi Haifa | 22 | 7 | 10 | 5 | 42 | 30 | +12 | 24 | |
| 6 | Hapoel Tel Aviv | 22 | 10 | 4 | 8 | 26 | 23 | +3 | 24 | |
| 7 | Bnei Yehuda | 22 | 9 | 1 | 12 | 34 | 51 | −17 | 19 | |
| 8 | Maccabi Netanya | 22 | 8 | 3 | 11 | 30 | 47 | −17 | 19 | |
| 9 | Maccabi Petah Tikva | 22 | 6 | 5 | 11 | 25 | 38 | −13 | 17 | |
| 10 | Beitar Tel Aviv | 22 | 6 | 5 | 11 | 14 | 26 | −12 | 17 | |
| 11 | Maccabi Jaffa | 22 | 5 | 6 | 11 | 23 | 36 | −13 | 16 | |
| 12 | Hapoel Ramat Gan | 22 | 7 | 2 | 13 | 31 | 50 | −19 | 16 | Relegated to Liga Alef |

Source: rsssf.com

== Results ==
| Home \ Away | BTA | BnY | HHA | HJE | HPT | HRG | HTA | MHA | MJA | MNE | MPT | MTA |
|---|---|---|---|---|---|---|---|---|---|---|---|---|
| Beitar Tel Aviv | — | 0–1 | 1–0 | 1–0 | 1–2 | 1–0 | 2–0 | 0–1 | 0–1 | 1–1 | 1–2 | 0–2 |
| Bnei Yehuda | 2–1 | — | 2–5 | 2–3 | 1–6 | 3–1 | 0–1 | 2–4 | 2–1 | 3–2 | 3–0 | 3–0 |
| Hapoel Haifa | 6–0 | 1–1 | — | 1–1 | 4–2 | 3–1 | 0–1 | 1–1 | 2–0 | 1–2 | 1–1 | 1–1 |
| Hapoel Jerusalem | 1–0 | 2–0 | 0–2 | — | 0–5 | 0–2 | 2–0 | 1–1 | 0–0 | 2–0 | 3–1 | 3–1 |
| Hapoel Petah Tikva | 2–0 | 6–1 | 1–0 | 1–1 | — | 4–0 | 1–2 | 3–2 | 3–1 | 7–2 | 3–0 | 2–2 |
| Hapoel Ramat Gan | 0–0 | 4–0 | 0–3 | 3–1 | 1–5 | — | 1–0 | 0–4 | 0–1 | 3–3 | 3–2 | 1–2 |
| Hapoel Tel Aviv | 0–1 | 0–2 | 2–0 | 0–0 | 3–2 | 1–2 | — | 1–0 | 1–0 | 3–0 | 2–1 | 3–3 |
| Maccabi Haifa | 1–1 | 5–1 | 1–2 | 1–0 | 2–2 | 6–2 | 1–1 | — | 2–2 | 1–2 | 4–1 | 1–1 |
| Maccabi Jaffa | 0–0 | 1–2 | 3–1 | 1–2 | 0–3 | 3–1 | 1–1 | 1–1 | — | 0–1 | 3–1 | 1–5 |
| Maccabi Netanya | 0–1 | 2–1 | 1–9 | 0–1 | 3–2 | 2–1 | 1–3 | 2–2 | 3–0 | — | 1–0 | 0–1 |
| Maccabi Petah Tikva | 2–0 | 2–1 | 1–1 | 2–2 | 1–3 | 0–3 | 1–0 | 0–0 | 1–1 | 2–0 | — | 3–0 |
| Maccabi Tel Aviv | 2–2 | 4–1 | 1–2 | 3–3 | 2–0 | 6–2 | 2–1 | 4–1 | 4–2 | 3–2 | 3–1 | — |

Legend: Blue = home team win; Yellow = draw; Red = away team win.
