= Hapoel Petah Tikva F.C. =

Israeli football club

Hapoel Petah Tikva
- Full name: Hapoel Petah Tikva Football Club
- Nicknames: Melabs (Mulabbis); Hamlabsim (The Mulabbis)
- Short name: HPT
- Founded: 1934; 92 years ago
- Ground: HaMoshava Stadium, Petah Tikva, Israel
- Capacity: 11,500
- Owners: Supporters of Hapoel Petah Tikva
- Chairman: Almog Portman
- Manager: Omer Peretz
- League: Israeli Premier League
Home colours	Away colours

Hapoel Petah Tikva F.C. (Hebrew: הפועל פתח תקווה) is an Israeli professional football club based in the city of Petah Tikva, currently playing in Israeli Premier League. Its most successful period was throughout the 1950s and 1960s, in which the club won six League Championships and one State Cups. The club holds to this day the record for most consecutive championships – five – and was ranked in the top three of the league for 14 years between 1954 and 1968. Hapoel Petah Tikva has not won the championship since 1963, and its last titles were the State Cup in 1992 and the Toto Cup in 2005.

== History ==
A chart showing the progress of Hapoel Petah Tikva through the Israeli football league system, from 1934–35 to the present

=== Pre-independence ===
Hapoel Petah Tikva was founded in 1926, and its football division was established in 1934. The club made it to the second league in 1938, and its first season in the top tier was 1941/42, two years after a new stadium was built on Abarbanel Street. In 1945, the club first came close to winning a title after beating Maccabi Petah Tikva 7–0 in the Cup semi-final, but lost 0–1 to Hapoel Tel Aviv in the final. Some of the leading players in the 1940s were Meir Nevenhoiz, Amichai Shoham, Eliyahu Kroshar, Yaakov Visoker and Moshe Varon.

=== The Golden Age – 1954–1968 ===
Hapoel Petah Tikva won its first championship in 1955, becoming the first team outside Tel Aviv to do so. The team was coached by Moshe Varon, and the top scorer was the young rising star, Nahum Stelmach, with 28 goals in 26 games. A chance to win a double was missed out after making it to the Cup final, but losing 1–3 to Maccabi Tel Aviv.

Two years later, in 1957, Hapoel Petah Tikva won its first state cup after beating Maccabi Jaffa 2–1 in the final. In 1959, after three consecutive years in second place, the team finally won its second championship. This was the first out of five back-to-back championships, a record no team in Israel has achieved again. Some of the leading players during these years were Nahum Stelmach, Yaakov Visoker, Boaz Koffman, Zakharia Ratzabi, Avshalom Ratzabi, Reuven Yeffet, and Jerry Haledy. The coaches were all foreign – Jackie Gibbons (England), Ignác Molnár (Hungary) and Miodrag Jovanović (Yugoslavia).

In 1961, they were invited to participate in the International Soccer League.

The streak ended in 1964, but in the following years, Hapoel Petah Tikva was still one of the strongest teams in Israel. The last season of this era was 1968, where the team ranked second and lost in the Cup Final to Bnei Yehuda. During the 14 years, Hapoel Petah Tikva won six championships, never dropped below third place, and made it to five cup finals (one win and four losses).

=== The Descent – 1969–1987 ===
In 1969, Hapoel Petah Tikva found itself at the lower part of the table for the first time since making it to the first division. Their leading players had retired, and during the first half of the 1970s, Hapoel was no longer a title contender and faced the danger of relegation several times. The only chance for a title during these years was in 1974, when the team made it to the cup final but lost to Hapoel Haifa. The semi-final against Beitar Jerusalem, which took place in Petah Tikva one week earlier, was marred by a violent incident, during which the supporters of Beitar invaded the pitch and attacked Hapoel players and supporters.

In 1976 Hapoel Petah Tikva dropped to the second division for the first time. This was an unfortunate relegation as it was the only season in the Israeli League in which four teams were relegated from the first division, with Hapoel being the fourth team to be relegated, and they were relegated on the final day of the season.

The club spent three years in the second division until achieving promotion back to the first division in 1979. Three years later, in 1982, Hapoel Petah Tikva was ranked last in the league and relegated again. Hapoel returned to the top flight after promotion in 1984. Around this time, the club first showed signs of recovering, with Giora Spiegel and Dror Bar Nur as managers building a firm base for the upcoming years.

=== Recovery – 1988–2002 ===
Towards the end of the 80s, Hapoel Petah Tikva once again became one of the leading football clubs in Israel. Avram Grant led the team for five seasons, starting at 1987. Between 1989 and 1991, Hapoel was on the brink of winning a seventh championship, their first in over 25 years, but finished second three times in a row. In 1991, it was an extremely close call, with one point missing to top Maccabi Haifa. Two matches prior to the end of that season, the two clubs met for a critical match in which two goals scored by Hapoel were controversially disallowed by Haim Livkovich, the referee. The controversial 0–0 draw cost Hapoel the title.

In the following year, the team dropped to fourth place, but finally won a major trophy again, after beating Maccabi Tel Aviv in the state cup final, 3–1. Following that, Hapoel Petah Tikva became the first Israeli team to participate in the UEFA Cup Winners’ Cup. It also became the first Israeli team to beat a major European club in any UEFA contest, with a 2–1 victory over Feyenoord (but knocked out due to a 0–1 loss in the away game).

In 1996, the club was purchased by the businessman Meir Shamir. In 1997, Hapoel Petah Tikva was ranked second in the league once again and competed in UEFA Cup for the first time. 2000 was another positive season, with the team competing for the championship, but ended up ranking third. Overall, the club seemed to be in a strong position in this era, being ranked in the top half of the league in 14 out of 15 seasons, with a strong player base and good youth teams. However, that did not last much longer.

=== Bankruptcy and Relegations – 2003–2015 ===
Starting at 2003, the team became gradually weaker. Homegrown players were being sold to other clubs, and every year, a larger portion of the squad was being replaced. In 2007, Hapoel Petach Tikva was relegated to the second division after 23 consecutive years in the first league. The club won promotion the following year, but signs of poor management were clear.

In the summer of 2011, the poor management proved to be even worse than expected when large debts were discovered and the club filed for bankruptcy. The team started the season with a 9-point deduction, which led to another relegation. In 2014 the team was promoted back, but faced relegation once again in the following season.

=== Second League and Fans Ownership – 2016–Present Day ===
The following years were even worse, with the team struggling in the second division. In the summer of 2018, seven years after the first time, the club declared bankruptcy once again. Therefore, the team started the 2019 season with a point deduction of 11 points, but still managed to avoid relegation.

In March 2019, Hapoel Petah Tikva became a fan-owned team, after the supporters' trust named 'The Blue' bought the club. This did not prevent an awful season in 2021, which ended with a relegation to the third division for the first time in history. However, the club ended up staying in the second division due to financial trouble in Hapoel Iksal.

In 2022, Israeli businessman Adam Neumann became a sponsor for the team.

At the end of the 2022-23 season, the team was ranked in second place and was promoted to the Israeli Premier League after 8 years in the Liga Leumit.

Near the end of the 2023-24 Israeli Premier League, Hapoel Petah Tikva was ranked the last place, thus making it go to Liga Leumit. The season after it, (2024-25), the team managed to advance to the Premier League with 4 rounds to go, thanks to a season characterized by a high rate of points accumulation and a strong defense that conceded few goals.

== Stadium ==
The home ground of Hapoel Petah Tikva is HaMoshava Stadium, which opened at the end of 2011, and replaced Petah Tikva Municipal Stadium as the home ground of the team.

== Current squad ==
As of 24 August 2026

No.	Pos.	Nation	Player
1	GK	ISR	Omer Katz
2	DF	ISR	Avishay Cohen
3	DF	ISR	Harel Shalom
4	DF	BOL	Diego Arroyo (on loan from Shakhtar Donetsk)
5	DF	GAB	Alex Moucketou-Moussounda
6	MF	ISR	Itay Ehud (on loan from Maccabi Haifa)
7	FW	ISR	Shavit Mazal
8	MF	ISR	Tomer Altman
9	FW	FRA	Franck Rivollier
11	FW	FRA	Hamidou Keyta
12	DF	ISR	Stav Israeli
14	MF	GHA	Edmond Asante (on loan from Ashdod)
16	MF	ISR	Roee David

No.	Pos.	Nation	Player
18	GK	ISR	Amit Mashiah
21	MF	ISR	Tedros Demelash
24	FW	ISR	Guy Badash
25	DF	ISR	Orel Dgani
26	MF	COD	Karim Kimvuidi
27	DF	ISR	Ido Tassa
28	MF	ISR	Noam Cohen
29	MF	CIV	Boni Amian
34	FW	ISR	Omri Cohen
66	DF	ISR	Moshe Meir
72	DF	ISR	Yazen Nassar
77	FW	CPV	Clé
—	FW	CIV	Erick Bile (on loan from Ludogorets)

=== Out on loan ===
No.	Pos.	Nation	Player

== Honours ==
=== League ===
Honour	No.	Years
Israeli Championships	6	1954–55, 1958–59, 1959–60, 1960–61, 1961–62, 1962–63

=== Cup competitions ===
Honour	No.	Years
State Cup	2	1956–57, 1991–92
Toto Cup (top division)	4	1985–86, 1989–90, 1990–91, 2004–05
Toto Cup (second division)	1	2007–08
Lilian Cup	1	1989
20th Anniversary Cup	1	1968

== Managers ==
- (Mandatory Palestine) David Wagner (1934–36)
- (Poland) (Mandatory Palestine) Shimon Ratner (1937–39)
- (Mandatory Palestine) Morris Elazar (1939–41)
- (Mandatory Palestine) Shlomo Poliakov (1942–46)
- (Israel) Moshe Poliakov (1947–52)
- (Israel) Moshe Varon (1952–53)
- (Israel) Moshe Poliakov (1953)
- (Israel) Moshe Varon (1953–54)
- (Israel) Moshe Poliakov (1954)
- (Israel) Moshe Varon (1954–56)
- (England) Jackie Gibbons (1956–57)
- (Israel) Eliezer Spiegel (1957–58)
- (England) Jackie Gibbons (1958–60)
- (Hungary) Ignác Molnár (1960–61)
- (Socialist Federal Republic of Yugoslavia) Miodrag Jovanović (1961–63)
- (Socialist Federal Republic of Yugoslavia) Slavko Milošević (1963–64)
- (Israel) Edmond Schmilovich (1964–66)
- (Socialist Federal Republic of Yugoslavia) Béla Pálfi (1966–67)
- (Israel) Nahum Stelmach (1967–69)
- (Socialist Federal Republic of Yugoslavia) Milovan Beljin (1969–72)
- (Israel) Rehavia Rosenbaum (1972–73)
- (Israel) Boaz Kofman (1973–75)
- (Israel) Arie Redler (1975–76)
- (Israel) Boaz Kofman (1976–77)
- (Israel) Aharon Kapitolnik (1977–78)
- (Israel) Amnon Raz (1978)
- (Israel) Michael Sheinfeld (1978–79)
- (Israel) Zvi Singel (1979–80)
- (Israel) Shimon Shenhar (1980)
- (Israel) Amatsia Levkovich (1980–81)
- (Israel) Itzhak Schneor (1981–82)
- (Israel) Boaz Kofman (1982)
- (Israel) Aharon Kapitolnik (1982–83)
- (Israel) Giora Spiegel (1983–86)
- (Israel) Avram Grant (July 1, 1986 – June 30, 1991)
- (Israel) Ze'ev Seltzer (1991–92)
- (Czechoslovakia) Ján Pivarník (1992–93)
- (Israel) David Schweitzer (1993)
- (Israel) Moshe Meiri (1993–94)
- (Israel) Dov Remler (1994)
- (Israel) Guy Levy (July 1, 1994 – June 30, 1996)
- (Israel) Nir Levine (1996–98)
- (Israel) Giora Spiegel (1998–99)
- (Israel) Nir Levine (1999–00)
- (Israel) Eli Cohen (July 1, 2000 – June 30, 2001)
- (Israel) Eli Guttman (2001–02)
- (Israel) Nir Levine (2002)
- (Israel) Freddy David (2003–05)
- (Israel) Dror Kashtan (July 1, 2004 – June 30, 2005)
- (Israel) Rafi Cohen (2005)
- (Israel) Nir Levine (2005–06)
- (Israel) Eyal Lahman (2006–07)
- (Israel) Uri Malmilian (2007–08)
- (Israel) Eli Mahpud (Feb 20, 2008 – April 9, 2009)
- (Israel) Danny Nir'on (July 1, 2009 – Nov 23, 2009)
- (Israel) Shavit Elimelech (Nov 22, 2009 – Dec 16, 2009)
- (Israel) Eli Mahpud (Dec 16, 2009 – Oct 16, 2010)
- (Israel) Yuval Naim (Oct 16, 2010 – April 13, 2011)
- (Israel) Gili Landau (Aug 17, 2011 – May 13, 2012)
- (Israel) Eli Mahpud (Aug 14, 2012–13)
- (Israel) Alon Mizrahi (2013)
- (Israel) Nissan Yehezkel (2013–14)
- (Israel) Idan Bar-On (2014–15)
- (Israel) Meni Koretski (2015–16)
- (Israel) Guy Tzarfati (2016)
- (Israel) Felix Naim (2016)
- (Israel) Asaf Nimni (2016)
- (Israel) Yaron Hochenboim (2016–2017)
- (Israel) Oren Krispin (2017)
- (Israel) Dani Golan (2017–2018)
- (Israel) Tomer Kashtan (2018)
- (Israel) Messay Dego (2018–2019)
- (Israel) Amir Nussbaum (2019–2020)
- (Israel) Messay Dego (2020)
- (Israel) Haim Shabo (2020–2021)
- (Israel) Klemi Saban (2021)
- (Israel) Ofer Talsepapa (2021–2024)
- (Israel) Benyamin Lam (2024)
- (Israel) Omer Peretz (2024-)
